= List of members of the Sabor, 1995–1999 =

The third Sabor was constituted on 29 October 1995. It came into existence following the October 1995 parliamentary election with mandates divided into 127 representatives.

== Parliamentary officials ==
The speaker of parliament was Vlatko Pavletić (HDZ).

Deputy speakers of parliament were:

- Žarko Domljan (HDZ)
- Jadranka Kosor (HDZ)
- Vladimir Šeks (HDZ)
- Stjepan Radić (HSS)
- Dražen Budiša (HSLS)

== Composition ==
=== By Political Party ===
Party	Seats
Croatian Democratic Union (HDZ)	75
Croatian Social Liberal Party (HSLS)	12
Croatian Peasant Party (HSS)	10
Social Democratic Party of Croatia (SDP)	10
Croatian Party of Rights (HSP)	4
Istrian Democratic Assembly (IDS)	4
Croatian People's Party (HNS)	2
Serb People's Party (SNS)	2
Croatian Christian Democratic Union (HKDU)	1
Croatian Independent Democrats (HND)	1
Slavonia-Baranja Croatian Party (SBHS)	1
Social Democratic Action of Croatia (ASH)	1
Independents	4
Total	127

=== MPs by Party ===
Party	Name
Croatian Democratic Union (75)	Nedjeljko Mihanović
Croatian Democratic Union (75)	Gojko Šušak
Croatian Democratic Union (75)	Nikica Valentić
Croatian Democratic Union (75)	Vlatko Pavletić
Croatian Democratic Union (75)	Elio Martinčić
Croatian Democratic Union (75)	Ivan Milas
Croatian Democratic Union (75)	Ivić Pašalić
Croatian Democratic Union (75)	Antun Vrdoljak
Croatian Democratic Union (75)	Luka Bebić
Croatian Democratic Union (75)	Martin Katičić
Croatian Democratic Union (75)	Borislav Škegro
Croatian Democratic Union (75)	Jurica Pavelić
Croatian Democratic Union (75)	Kazimir Sviben
Croatian Democratic Union (75)	Antun Dubravko Jelčić
Croatian Democratic Union (75)	Katarina Fuček
Croatian Democratic Union (75)	Drago Krpina
Croatian Democratic Union (75)	Marija Bajt
Croatian Democratic Union (75)	Mladen Jurković
Croatian Democratic Union (75)	Milovan Šibl
Croatian Democratic Union (75)	Milan Kovač
Croatian Democratic Union (75)	Đuro Perica
Croatian Democratic Union (75)	Zlatko Canjuga
Croatian Democratic Union (75)	Jakob Eltz Vukovarski
Croatian Democratic Union (75)	Mario Kapulica
Croatian Democratic Union (75)	Željko Bujas
Croatian Democratic Union (75)	Hrvoje Hitrec
Croatian Democratic Union (75)	Marino Golob
Croatian Democratic Union (75)	Bosiljko Mišetić
Croatian Democratic Union (75)	Smiljko Sokol
Croatian Democratic Union (75)	Milivoj Kujundžić
Croatian Democratic Union (75)	Vera Stanić
Croatian Democratic Union (75)	Branimir Pasecky
Croatian Democratic Union (75)	Ivan Rabuzin
Croatian Democratic Union (75)	Matej Janković
Croatian Democratic Union (75)	Đuro Njavro
Croatian Democratic Union (75)	Marin Mileta
Croatian Democratic Union (75)	Juraj Buzolić
Croatian Democratic Union (75)	Damir Škaro
Croatian Democratic Union (75)	Ivan Kolak
Croatian Democratic Union (75)	Dragan Kovačević
Croatian Democratic Union (75)	Kruno Bošnjak
Croatian Democratic Union (75)	Ivan Hranjec
Croatian Democratic Union (75)	Ante Beljo
Croatian Democratic Union (75)	Marijan Petrović
Croatian Democratic Union (75)	Zdenka Babić-Petričević
Croatian Democratic Union (75)	Vladimir Šoljić
Croatian Democratic Union (75)	Zdravka Bušić
Croatian Democratic Union (75)	Ivo Lozančić
Croatian Democratic Union (75)	Jozo Marić
Croatian Democratic Union (75)	Zdravko Sančević
Croatian Democratic Union (75)	Stanislav Janović
Croatian Democratic Union (75)	Stipe Hrkač
Croatian Democratic Union (75)	Bruno Uroić
Croatian Democratic Union (75)	Franka Barbić
Croatian Democratic Union (75)	Ivica Gaži
Croatian Democratic Union (75)	Ivan Jarnjak
Croatian Democratic Union (75)	Đuro Brodarac
Croatian Democratic Union (75)	Janko Bobetko
Croatian Democratic Union (75)	Josip Jakovčić
Croatian Democratic Union (75)	Franjo Gregurić
Croatian Democratic Union (75)	Mladen Markač
Croatian Democratic Union (75)	Dražen Bobinac
Croatian Democratic Union (75)	Đuro Dečak
Croatian Democratic Union (75)	Antun Pitlović
Croatian Democratic Union (75)	Joso Škara
Croatian Democratic Union (75)	Branimir Glavaš
Croatian Democratic Union (75)	Vladimir Šeks
Croatian Democratic Union (75)	Josip Juras
Croatian Democratic Union (75)	Juraj Njavro
Croatian Democratic Union (75)	Anton Kovačev
Croatian Democratic Union (75)	Jure Radić
Croatian Democratic Union (75)	Mate Granić
Croatian Democratic Union (75)	Žarko Domljan
Croatian Democratic Union (75)	Branko Mikša
Croatian Democratic Union (75)	Andrija Hebrang
Croatian Social Liberal Party (12)	Dražen Budiša
Croatian Social Liberal Party (12)	Vladimir Gotovac
Croatian Social Liberal Party (12)	Đurđa Adlešić
Croatian Social Liberal Party (12)	Jozo Radoš
Croatian Social Liberal Party (12)	Ivica Ropuš
Croatian Social Liberal Party (12)	Zlatko Kramarić
Croatian Social Liberal Party (12)	Vladimir Primorac
Croatian Social Liberal Party (12)	Božo Kovačević
Croatian Social Liberal Party (12)	Ivan Herak
Croatian Social Liberal Party (12)	Baltazar Jalšovec
Croatian Social Liberal Party (12)	Ante Tukić
Croatian Social Liberal Party (12)	Branko Levačić
Croatian Peasant Party (10)	Josip Pankretić
Croatian Peasant Party (10)	Zlatko Tomčić
Croatian Peasant Party (10)	Stjepan Radić
Croatian Peasant Party (10)	Luka Trconić
Croatian Peasant Party (10)	Joško Kovač
Croatian Peasant Party (10)	Marko Miljević
Croatian Peasant Party (10)	Petar Žitnik
Croatian Peasant Party (10)	Ivan Kolar
Croatian Peasant Party (10)	Juraj Biščan
Croatian Peasant Party (10)	Marijan Filipović
Social Democratic Party (10)	Ivica Račan
Social Democratic Party (10)	Mato Arlović
Social Democratic Party (10)	Željka Antunović
Social Democratic Party (10)	Antun Vujić
Social Democratic Party (10)	Marin Jurjević
Social Democratic Party (10)	Nikola Ivaniš
Social Democratic Party (10)	Dragica Zgrebec
Social Democratic Party (10)	Snježana Biga Friganović
Social Democratic Party (10)	Slavko Linić
Social Democratic Party (10)	Zdravko Tomac
Croatian Party of Rights (4)	Anto Đapić
Croatian Party of Rights (4)	Boris Kandare
Croatian Party of Rights (4)	Vlado Jukić
Croatian Party of Rights (4)	Ivan Gabelica
Istrian Democratic Assembly (4)	Luciano Delbianco
Istrian Democratic Assembly (4)	Dino Debeljuh
Istrian Democratic Assembly (4)	Damir Kajin
Istrian Democratic Assembly (4)	Ivan Jakovčić
Croatian People's Party (2)	Radimir Čačić
Croatian People's Party (2)	Srećko Bijelić
Serb People's Party (2)	Milan Đukić
Serb People's Party (2)	Veselin Pejnović
Croatian Christian Democratic Union (1)	Marko Veselica
Croatian Independent Democrats (1)	Alojz Brkić
Slavonia-Baranja Croatian Party (1)	Slavko Vukšić
Social Democratic Action of Croatia (1)	Milorad Pupovac
Independents (4)	Furio Radin
Independents (4)	Sandor Jakab
Independents (4)	Njegovan Starek
Independents (4)	Miroslav Kiš
