= List of members of the Sabor, 2000–2003 =

The fourth Sabor was constituted on 2 February 2000 with mandates divided into 151 representatives after the 3 January 2000 elections.

== Parliamentary officials ==
The president of the parliament (often also called the speaker in English) was Zlatko Tomčić (HSS).

Vice presidents of the parliament were:

- Mato Arlović (SDP)
- Baltazar Jalšovec (LIBRA)
- Ivica Kostović (HDZ)
- Vlatko Pavletić (HDZ)
- Zdravko Tomac (SDP)

== Representatives in the fifth assembly ==
Party	Name	Constituency
Croatian Bloc (5)	Zdravka Bušić	
Croatian Bloc (5)	Krunoslav Gašparić	
Croatian Bloc (5)	Milan Kovač	
Croatian Bloc (5)	Ivić Pašalić	
Croatian Bloc (5)	Ivica Tafra	
Croatian Christian Democratic Union (1)	Anto Kovačević	
Croatian Democratic Union (33)	Zdenka Babić-Petričević	
Croatian Democratic Union (33)	Marija Bajt	
Croatian Democratic Union (33)	Luka Bebić	
Croatian Democratic Union (33)	Ivica Buconjić	
Croatian Democratic Union (33)	Karmela Caparin	
Croatian Democratic Union (33)	Ljubo Ćesić	
Croatian Democratic Union (33)	Đuro Dečak	
Croatian Democratic Union (33)	Branimir Glavaš	
Croatian Democratic Union (33)	Ivan Jarnjak	
Croatian Democratic Union (33)	Mate Jukić	
Croatian Democratic Union (33)	Božidar Kalmeta	
Croatian Democratic Union (33)	Krunoslav Kordić	
Croatian Democratic Union (33)	Jadranka Kosor	
Croatian Democratic Union (33)	Ivica Kostović	
Croatian Democratic Union (33)	Željko Krapljan	
Croatian Democratic Union (33)	Drago Krpina	
Croatian Democratic Union (33)	Zlatko Mateša	
Croatian Democratic Union (33)	Marina Matulović-Dropulić	
Croatian Democratic Union (33)	Ivan Milas	
Croatian Democratic Union (33)	Juraj Njavro	
Croatian Democratic Union (33)	Josip Odak	
Croatian Democratic Union (33)	Vlatko Pavletić	
Croatian Democratic Union (33)	Ivan Penić	
Croatian Democratic Union (33)	Velimir Pleša	
Croatian Democratic Union (33)	Jure Radić	
Croatian Democratic Union (33)	Ivo Sanader	
Croatian Democratic Union (33)	Josip Sesar	
Croatian Democratic Union (33)	Vladimir Šeks	
Croatian Democratic Union (33)	Nevio Šetić	
Croatian Democratic Union (33)	Dubravka Šuica	
Croatian Democratic Union (33)	Ivan Šuker	
Croatian Democratic Union (33)	Nikica Valentić	
Croatian Democratic Union (33)	Hrvoje Vojvoda	
Croatian Independent Democrats (1)	Zlatko Canjuga	
Croatian Party of Rights (4)	Anto Đapić	
Croatian Party of Rights (4)	Vlado Jukić	
Croatian Party of Rights (4)	Boris Kandare/Miroslav Rožić	
Croatian Party of Rights (4)	Tonči Tadić	
Croatian Peasant Party (16)	Zdenka Čuhnil	
Croatian Peasant Party (16)	Miroslav Furdek	
Croatian Peasant Party (16)	Josip Golubić	
Croatian Peasant Party (16)	Zdenko Haramija	
Croatian Peasant Party (16)	Ivan Kolar	
Croatian Peasant Party (16)	Ljubica Lalić	
Croatian Peasant Party (16)	Marijan Mačina	
Croatian Peasant Party (16)	Ante Markov	
Croatian Peasant Party (16)	Marijan Maršić	
Croatian Peasant Party (16)	Marijana Petir	
Croatian Peasant Party (16)	Luka Roić	
Croatian Peasant Party (16)	Zlatko Tomčić	
Croatian Peasant Party (16)	Josip Torbar	
Croatian Peasant Party (16)	Luka Trconić	
Croatian Peasant Party (16)	Petar Žitnik	
Croatian Peasant Party (16)	Stjepan Živković	
Croatian People's Party (2)	Vesna Pusić	
Croatian People's Party (2)	Darko Šantić	
Croatian Social Liberal Party (15)	Đurđa Adlešič	
Croatian Social Liberal Party (15)	Marko Baričević	
Croatian Social Liberal Party (15)	Dražen Budiša	
Croatian Social Liberal Party (15)	Ivan Čehok	
Croatian Social Liberal Party (15)	Željko Dragović	
Croatian Social Liberal Party (15)	Željko Glavan	
Croatian Social Liberal Party (15)	Ante Grabovac	
Croatian Social Liberal Party (15)	Želimir Janjić	
Croatian Social Liberal Party (15)	Jadranka Katarinčić-Škrlj	
Croatian Social Liberal Party (15)	Joško Kontić	
Croatian Social Liberal Party (15)	Mario Kovač	
Croatian Social Liberal Party (15)	Jadranko Mijalić	
Croatian Social Liberal Party (15)	Dorica Nikolić	
Croatian Social Liberal Party (15)	Ivan Škarić	
Croatian Social Liberal Party (15)	Hrvoje Zorić	
Croatian True Revival Party (3)	Ante Beljo	
Croatian True Revival Party (3)	Đuro Njavro	
Croatian True Revival Party (3)	Dario Vukić	
Democratic Centre (3)	Mate Granić	
Democratic Centre (3)	Pavao Miljavac	
Democratic Centre (3)	Vesna Škare Ožbolt	
Istrian Democratic Assembly (4)	Valter Drandić	
Istrian Democratic Assembly (4)	Damir Kajin	
Istrian Democratic Assembly (4)	Dorotea Pešić-Bukovac	
Istrian Democratic Assembly (4)	Valter Poropat	
Liberal Party (4)	Karl Gorinšek	
Liberal Party (4)	Borislav Graljuk	
Liberal Party (4)	Zlatko Kramarić	
Liberal Party (4)	Tibor Santo	
LIBRA – Party of Liberal Democrats (9)	Viktor Brož	
LIBRA – Party of Liberal Democrats (9)	Goranko Fižulić	
LIBRA – Party of Liberal Democrats (9)	Zrinjka Glovacki-Bernardi	
LIBRA – Party of Liberal Democrats (9)	Mladen Godek	
LIBRA – Party of Liberal Democrats (9)	Vilim Herman	
LIBRA – Party of Liberal Democrats (9)	Baltazar Jalšovec	
LIBRA – Party of Liberal Democrats (9)	Hrvoje Kraljević	
LIBRA – Party of Liberal Democrats (9)	Željko Pavlic	
LIBRA – Party of Liberal Democrats (9)	Ivo Škrabalo	
Primorje-Gorski Kotar Alliance (2)	Nikola Ivaniš	
Primorje-Gorski Kotar Alliance (2)	Darijo Vasilić	
Serbian People's Party (1)	Milan Đukić	
Slavonia-Baranja Croatian Party (1)	Damir Jurić	
Social Democratic Party of Croatia (44)	Mato Arlović	
Social Democratic Party of Croatia (44)	Branka Baletić	
Social Democratic Party of Croatia (44)	Snježana Biga Friganović	
Social Democratic Party of Croatia (44)	Sonja Borovčak	
Social Democratic Party of Croatia (44)	Dijana Čizmadija	
Social Democratic Party of Croatia (44)	Lucija Debeljuh	
Social Democratic Party of Croatia (44)	Mirjana Didović	
Social Democratic Party of Croatia (44)	Ivo Fabijanić	
Social Democratic Party of Croatia (44)	Mirjana Ferić-Vac	
Social Democratic Party of Croatia (44)	Stjepan Henezi	
Social Democratic Party of Croatia (44)	Dubravka Horvat	
Social Democratic Party of Croatia (44)	Marin Jurjević	
Social Democratic Party of Croatia (44)	Pavle Kalinić	
Social Democratic Party of Croatia (44)	Sanja Kapetanović	
Social Democratic Party of Croatia (44)	Slavko Kojić	
Social Democratic Party of Croatia (44)	Miroslav Korenika	
Social Democratic Party of Croatia (44)	Krešo Kovačićek	
Social Democratic Party of Croatia (44)	Franjo Kučar	
Social Democratic Party of Croatia (44)	Ljiljana Kuhta	
Social Democratic Party of Croatia (44)	Josip Leko	
Social Democratic Party of Croatia (44)	Vedran Lendić	
Social Democratic Party of Croatia (44)	Marija Lugarić	
Social Democratic Party of Croatia (44)	Boris Mahač	
Social Democratic Party of Croatia (44)	Željko Malević	
Social Democratic Party of Croatia (44)	Romano Meštrović	
Social Democratic Party of Croatia (44)	Ivan Ninić	
Social Democratic Party of Croatia (44)	Milanka Opačić	
Social Democratic Party of Croatia (44)	Josip Pavković	
Social Democratic Party of Croatia (44)	Vesna Podlipec	
Social Democratic Party of Croatia (44)	Jadranka Reihl-Kir	
Social Democratic Party of Croatia (44)	Katica Sedmak	
Social Democratic Party of Croatia (44)	Nenad Stazić	
Social Democratic Party of Croatia (44)	Vladimir Šepčić	
Social Democratic Party of Croatia (44)	Zlatko Šešelj	
Social Democratic Party of Croatia (44)	Zoran Šimatović	
Social Democratic Party of Croatia (44)	Ivo Šlaus	
Social Democratic Party of Croatia (44)	Ivan Štajduhar	
Social Democratic Party of Croatia (44)	Zdravko Tomac	
Social Democratic Party of Croatia (44)	Branislav Tušek	
Social Democratic Party of Croatia (44)	Zorko Vidiček	
Social Democratic Party of Croatia (44)	Dragutin Vrus	
Social Democratic Party of Croatia (44)	Dragutin Vukušić	
Social Democratic Party of Croatia (44)	Dragica Zgrebec	
Social Democratic Party of Croatia (44)	Tonči Žuvela	
