= Electoral district II (Croatian Parliament) =

- Constituency for the Croatian Parliament
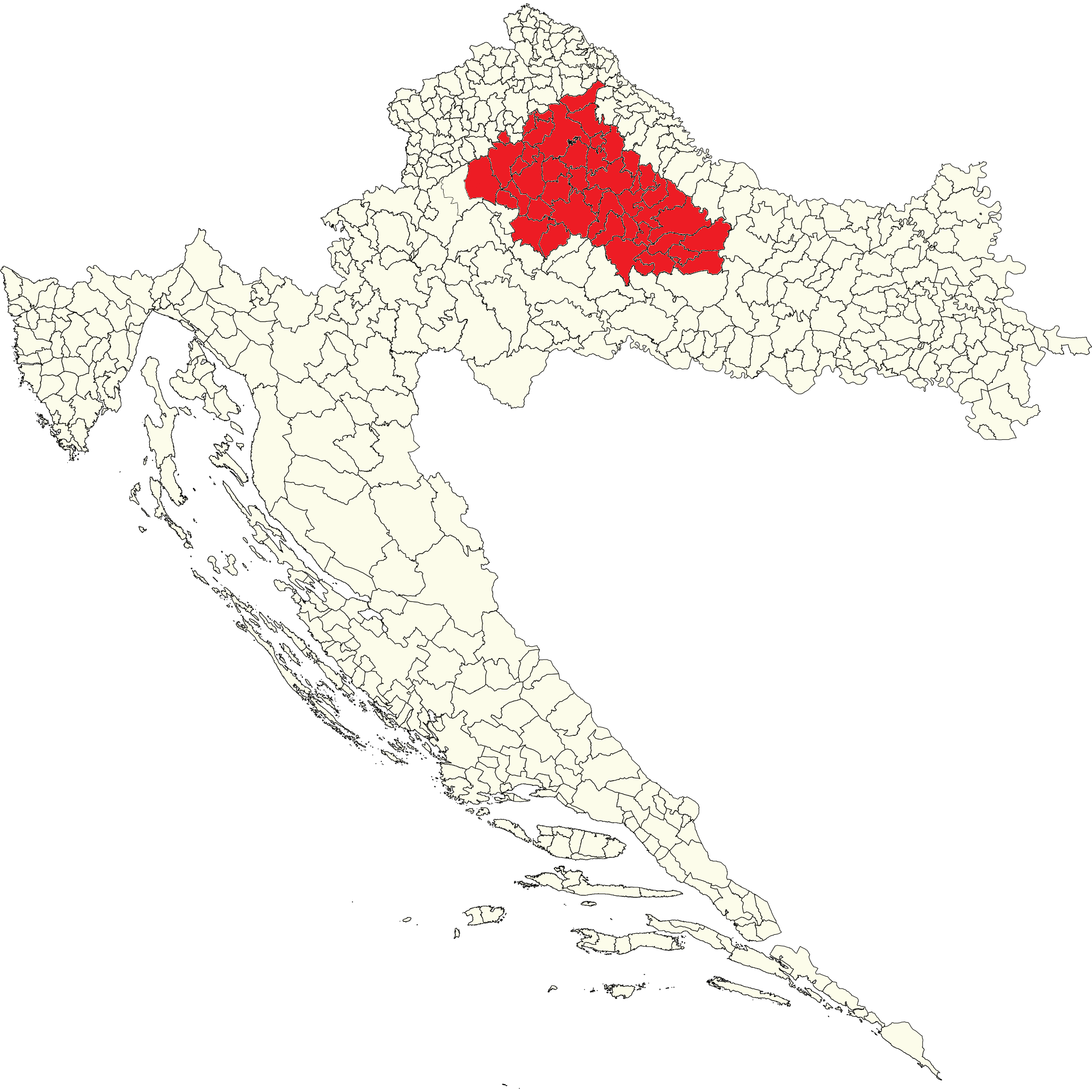
- Map of Electoral district II (2023-present)
- Electorate: 358,003 (2025)
- Major settlements: Zagreb, Dugo Selo, Ivanić-Grad, Sveti Ivan Zelina, Vrbovec, Križevci

Current constituency
- Created: 2023
- Number of members: 14

Electoral district II (Croatian: II. izborna jedinica) is one of twelve electoral districts of the Croatian Parliament. In 2025, the district had 358,003 registered voters.

== Boundaries ==
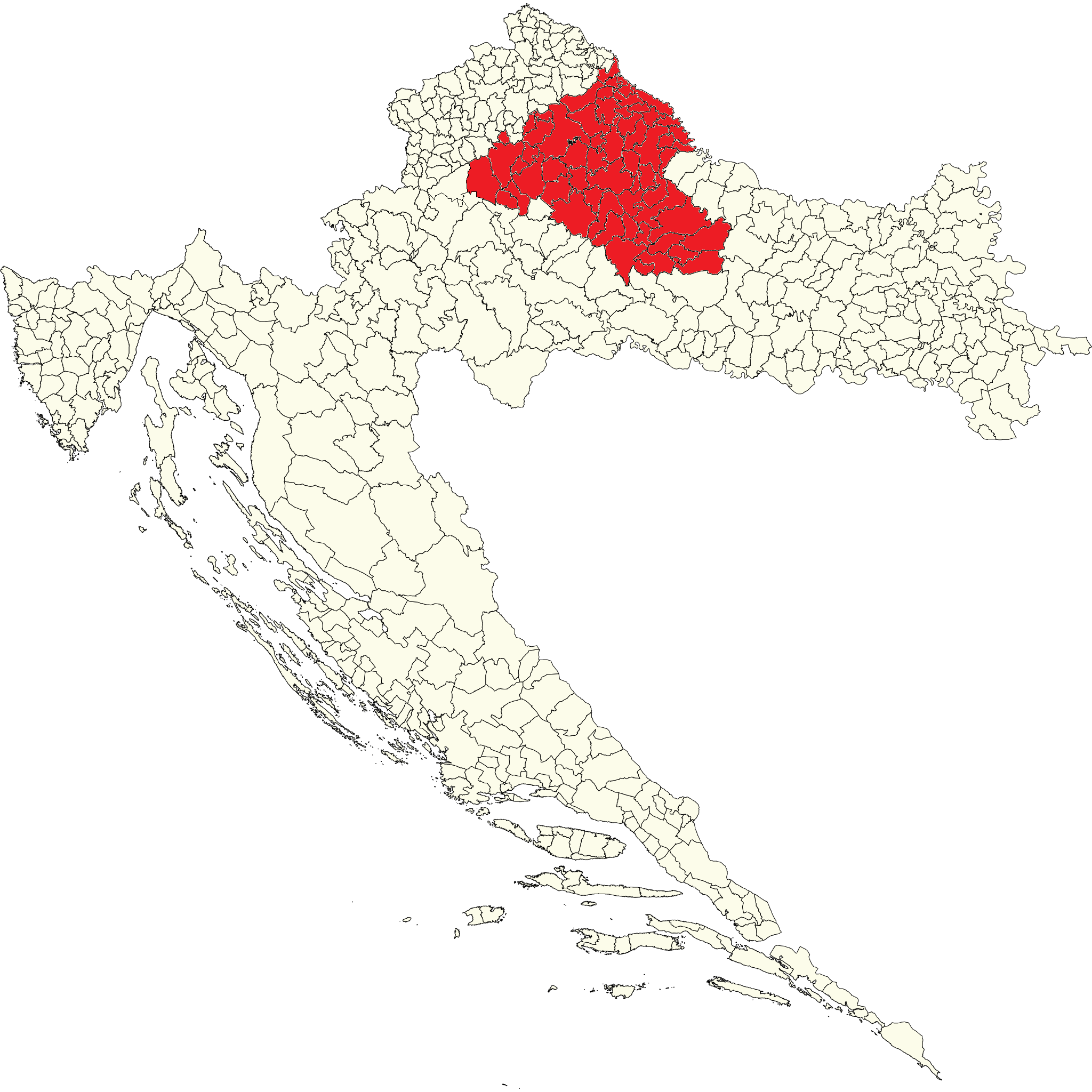
Electoral district II (1999-2023)

=== Creation ===
Electoral district II consist of:

- Eastern part of Zagreb County:
  - cities and municipalities: Bedenica, Brckovljani, Dubrava, Dugo Selo, Farkaševac, Gradec, Preseka, Rakovec, Sveti Ivan Zelina, Vrbovec;
- Whole Koprivnica-Križevci County;
- Whole Bjelovar-Bilogora County;
- Eastern part of City of Zagreb:
  - city districts and streets: Adamovec, Belovar, Blaguša, Budenec, Cerje-Sesvete, Dobrodol, Drenčec, Dubec, Dumovec, Đurđekovec, Gajec, Gajišće, Glavnica Donja, Glavnica Gornja, Glavničica, Goranec, Jelkovec, Jesenovec, Kašina, Kašinska Sopnica, Kobiljak, Kučilovina, Kućanec, Luka Sesvete, Lužan, Markovo Polje, Moravče, Novo Brestje, Paruževina, Planina Donja, Planina Gornja, Popovec, Prekvršje, Prepuštovec, Sesvete-Centar, Sesvetska Sela, Sesvetska Selnica, Sesvetska Sopnica, Soblinec, Staro Brestje, Šašinovec, Šija Vrh, Šimunčevec, Vuger Selo, Vugrovec Donji, Vugrovec Gornji, Vurnovec, Žerjavinec and settlements in Dubrava: Trnovčica, Studentski Grad and Poljanice; Granešina, Dankovec, Miroševac, Oporovec, Granešinski Novaki, Zeleni Brijeg, Čulinec, Stari Retkovec, Klaka, Dubrava-središte, Gornja Dubrava, Ivan Mažuranić, Novi Retkovec, Donja Dubrava, 30. svibnja 1990., Čučerje, Branovec-Jalšovec, Novoselec.

=== 2023 revision ===
Under the 2023 revision, district boundaries were redrawn according to the suggestion of the Constitutional Court to compel a proportional number of voters.

The new district consist of:

- The whole Bjelovar-Bilogora county
- The eastern part of the City of Zagreb:
  - city districts: Donja Dubrava, Gornja Dubrava and Sesvete
- The eastern and southeastern part of Zagreb county:
  - cities and municipalities: Dugo Selo, Ivanić-Grad, Sveti Ivan Zelina, Vrbovec, Bedenica, Brckovljani, Dubrava, Farkaševac, Gradec, Kloštar Ivanić, Križ, Preseka and Rakovec
- The western and southern part of Koprivnica-Križevci county:
  - cities and municipalities: Križevci, Gornja Rijeka, Kalnik, Rasinja, Sokolovac, Sveti Ivan Žabno and Sveti Petar Orehovec

== Representatives ==
The current representatives of the second electoral district in the Croatian Parliament are:

Name	Party	Deputizing
Zdravka Bušić	HDZ	Gordan Grlić-Radman
Ante Deur	HDZ	
Gordan Jandroković	HDZ	
Krunoslav Katičić	HDZ	
Miro Totgergeli	HDZ	
Denis Kralj	SDP	Tomislav Golubić
Boris Lalovac	SDP	
Tanja Sokolić	SDP	
Tomislav Josić	DP	
Ivica Mesić	DP	Stephen Nikola Bartulica
Jelena Miloš	Možemo!	Danijela Dolenec
Dario Hrebak	HSLS	
Nino Raspudić	Independent	
Anka Mrak-Taritaš	GLAS	

== Election ==
=== 2000 Elections ===
Party	Votes	%	Seats
HSLS - SDP	125.931	42.41	7
HDZ	70.672	23.80	4
HSS - LS - HNS	53.284	17.94	3
others	47.049	15.85	0
Total	296.936	100	14
Valid votes	296.936	98.32	
Invalid/blank votes	5.061	1.68	
Total votes	301.997	78.40	
Registered voters/turnout	385.179		
Source: Results Archived 2022-11-05 at the Wayback Machine

SDP - HSLS

- Dražen Budiša
- Đurđa Adlešić
- Gordana Sobol
- Franjo Kučar
- Stjepan Henezi
- Ivo Čović
- Mladen Godek

HDZ

- Ljerka Mintas-Hodak
- Ivić Pašalić
- Đuro Njavro
- Karmela Caparin

HSS - LS - HNS

- Zlatko Tomčić
- Željko Ledinski
- Ivan Kolar

=== 2003 Elections ===
Party	Votes	%	Seats	+/-
HDZ	82.030	32.14	6	+2
SDP - LIBRA	53.928	21.13	4	-1
HSS	35.456	13.89	2	-1
HSP	16.658	6.53	1	+1
HSLS - DC	15.342	6.01	1	-1
others	51.822	20.30	0	0
Total	255.236	100	14	0
Valid votes	255.236	97.55		
Invalid/blank votes	6.397	2.45		
Total votes	261.633	67.31		
Registered voters/turnout	388.713			
Source: Results Archived 2022-11-05 at the Wayback Machine

HDZ

- Andrija Hebrang
- Gordan Jandroković
- Ivana Sušec-Trakoštanec
- Damir Sesvečan
- Stjepan Bačić
- Karmela Caparin

SDP - LIBRA

- Milan Bandić
- Zvonimir Mršić
- Jozo Radoš
- Ivica Pančić

HSS

- Zlatko Tomčić
- Josip Friščić

HSP

- Pero Kovačević

HSLS - DC

- Đurđa Adlešić

=== 2007 Elections ===
Party	Votes	%	Seats	+/-
SDP	83.523	33.33	6	+2
HDZ	79.784	31.84	5	-1
HSS - HSLS	41.417	16.53	3	0
others	45.888	18.30	0	-1
Total	250.612	100	14	0
Valid votes	250.612	98.56		
Invalid/blank votes	3.656	1.44		
Total votes	254.268	63.62		
Registered voters/turnout	399.648			
Source: Results Archived 2022-11-06 at the Wayback Machine

SDP

- Milan Bandić
- Zvonimir Mršić
- Boris Šprem
- Marija Lugarić
- Ivica Pančić
- Vesna Škulić

HDZ

- Andrija Hebrang
- Damir Polančec
- Gordan Jandroković
- Damir Sesvečan
- Bianca Matković

HSS - HSLS

- Josip Friščić
- Đurđa Adlešić
- Damir Bajs

=== 2011 Elections ===
Party	Votes	%	Seats	+/-
SDP - HNS - IDS - HSU	104.516	42.63	8	+2
HDZ	52.652	21.48	4	-1
HSS	14.854	6.06	1	-2
HL SR	14.161	5.78	1	+1
others	58.960	24.05	0	0
Total	245.143	100	14	0
Valid votes	245.143	98.41		
Invalid/blank votes	3.958	1.59		
Total votes	249.101	61.70		
Registered voters/turnout	403.716			
Source: Results Archived 2022-11-06 at the Wayback Machine

SDP - HNS - IDS - HSU

- Zvonimir Mršić
- Boris Šprem
- Gordan Maras
- Dragica Zgrebec
- Željko Šemper
- Darko Ledinski
- Marija Lugarić
- Vedran Babić

HDZ

- Đuro Popijač
- Davorin Mlakar
- Martina Banić
- Stjepan Milinković

HSS

- Josip Friščić

HL SR

- Zlatko Tušak

=== 2015 Elections ===
Party	Votes	%	Seats	+/-
HDZ - HSS - HSP AS - BUZ - HSLS - HRAST - HDS - ZDS	76.461	33.35	6	+1
SDP - HNS - HSU - HL SR - A-HSS - ZS	74.488	32.49	5	-4
Most	30.097	13.13	2	+2
BM365 - DPS - DSŽ - HES - HRS - HSZ - ID - MS - NSH - Novi val - SU - UDU - Zeleni - ZS	18.164	7.92	1	+1
others	30.079	13.11	0	0
Total	229.289	100	14	0
Valid votes	229.289	98.34		
Invalid/blank votes	3.871	1.66		
Total votes	233.160	61.28		
Registered voters/turnout	380.485			
Source: Results

HDZ - HSS - HSP AS - BUZ - HSLS - HRAST - HDS - ZDS

- Miroslav Tuđman
- Branko Hrg
- Andrija Mikulić
- Miro Kovač
- Darko Sobota
- Dario Hrebak

SDP - HNS - HSU - HL SR - A-HSS - ZS

- Josip Leko
- Anka Mrak-Taritaš
- Gordan Maras
- Vedran Babić
- Gordana Sobol

Most

- Ivan Lovrinović
- Ljubica Ambrušec

BM365 - DPS - DSŽ - HES - HRS - HSZ - ID - MS - NSH - Novi val - SU - UDU - Zeleni - ZS

- Milan Bandić

=== 2016 Elections ===
Party	Votes	%	Seats	+/-
HDZ - HSLS	69.224	35.54	6	0
SDP - HNS - HSS - HSU	68.603	35.22	5	0
BM365 - NS R - Novi val - HSS SR - BUZ	18.011	9.24	1	0
Most	16.776	8.61	1	-1
ŽZ - PH - AM - HDSS - Abeceda	13.590	6.97	1	+1
others	8.570	4.42	0	0
Total	194.774	100	14	0
Valid votes	194.774	98.29		
Invalid/blank votes	3.391	1.71		
Total votes	198.165	52.40		
Registered voters/turnout	378.186			
Source: Results Archived 2022-11-06 at the Wayback Machine

HDZ - HSLS

- Zlatko Hasanbegović
- Ivana Maletić
- Milijan Brkić
- Andrija Mikulić
- Branko Hrg
- Miro Totgergeli

SDP - HNS - HSS - HSU

- Anka Mrak-Taritaš
- Gordan Maras
- Stjepan Kožić
- Vedran Babić
- Kažimir Varda

BM365 - NS R - Novi val - HSS SR - BUZ

- Milan Bandić

Most

- Slaven Dobrović

ŽZ - PH - AM - HDSS - Abeceda

- Ivan Lovrinović

=== 2020 Elections ===
Party	Votes	%	Seats	+/-
HDZ - HSLS	58.046	34.29	6	0
SDP - HSS - HSU - SNAGA - GLAS - IDS - PGS	41.619	24.58	4	-1
DP - HS - BLOK - HKS - HRAST - SU - ZL	22.865	13.50	2	+2
Most	13.395	7.91	1	0
Možemo - ZJN - NL - RF - ORAH - ZG	9.388	5.54	1	+1
others	23.939	14.18	0	-2
Total	169.252	100	14	0
Valid votes	169.252	97.69		
Invalid/blank votes	4.002	2.31		
Total votes	173.254	44.67		
Registered voters/turnout	387.890			
Source: Results Archived 2022-11-06 at the Wayback Machine

HDZ - HSLS

- Gordan Jandroković
- Dario Hrebak
- Miroslav Tuđman
- Ante Deur
- Gordan Grlić-Radman
- Miro Totgergeli

SDP - HSS - HSU - SNAGA - GLAS - IDS - PGS

- Rajko Ostojić
- Mišel Jakšić
- Damir Bajs
- Vesna Nađ

DP - HS - BLOK - HKS - HRAST - SU - ZL

- Miroslav Škoro
- Milan Vrkljan

Most

- Nino Raspudić

Možemo - ZJN - NL - RF - ORAH - ZG

- Vili Matula

=== 2024 Elections ===
Party	Votes	%	Seats	+/-
HDZ - HSLS - HDS - HNS - HSU	71.695	35.34	6	0
SDP - Centar - HSS - DO i SIP - NS R - GLAS	50.383	24.83	4	0
DP - PiP - DHSS - ZL - Agrameri	22.592	11.13	2	0
Most - HS - HKS - NLM	18.404	9.07	1	0
Možemo - HP	17.399	8.57	1	0
others	28.117	11.06	0	0
Total	208.590	100	14	0
Valid votes	202.854	97.25		
Invalid/blank votes	5.736	2.75		
Total votes	208.590	60.39		
Registered voters/turnout	345.398			
Source: Results Archived 2024-04-20 at the Wayback Machine

HDZ - HSLS - HDS - HNS - HSU

- Gordan Jandroković
- Dario Hrebak
- Krunoslav Katičić
- Ante Deur
- Gordan Grlić-Radman
- Miro Totgergeli

SDP - Centar - HSS - DO i SIP - NS R - GLAS

- Boris Lalovac
- Tanja Sokolić
- Anka Mrak-Taritaš
- Tomislav Golubić

DP - PiP - DHSS - ZL - Agrameri

- Tomislav Josić
- Stephen Nikola Bartulica

Most - HS - HKS - NLM

- Nino Raspudić

Možemo - HP

- Danijela Dolenec
