= Cabinet of Stjepan Mesić =

Croatian government (1990)

Mesić Cabinet
- 1st Cabinet of the Republic of Croatia

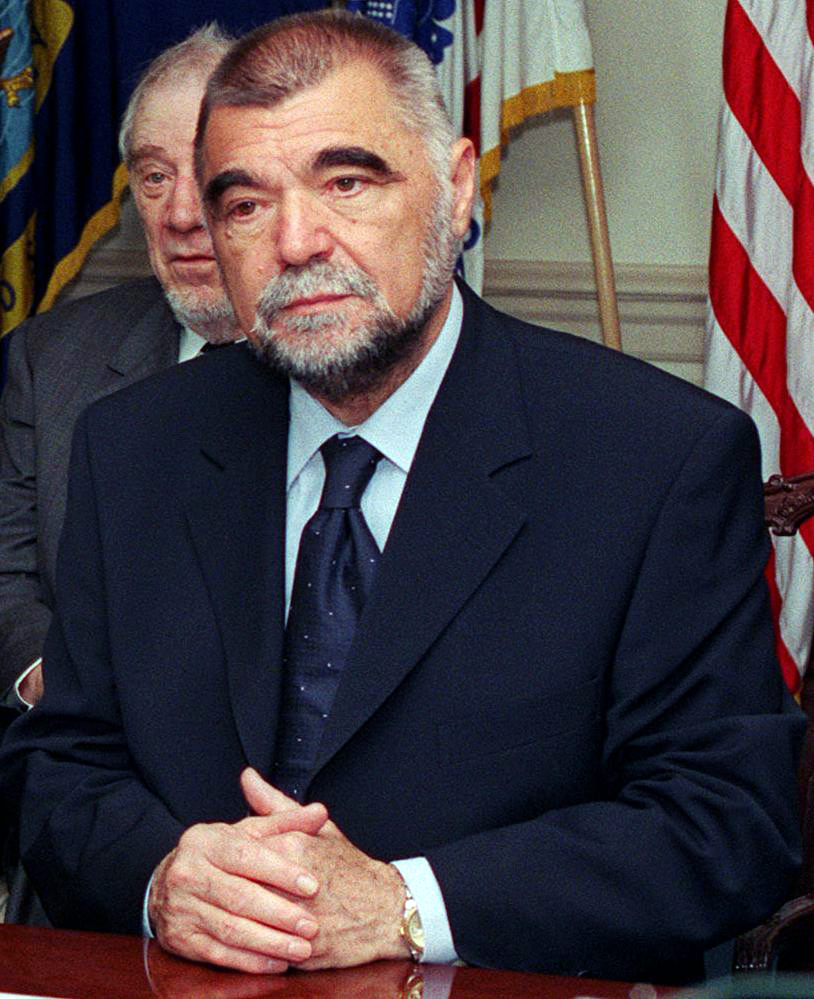
- Date formed: 30 May 1990
- Date dissolved: 24 August 1990

People and organisations
- Head of state: Franjo Tuđman
- Head of government: Stjepan Mesić
- Deputy head of government: Bernardo Jurlina; Mate Babić; Milan Ramljak
- No. of ministers: 26 (on 24 August 1990)
- Total no. of members: 26 (including former members)
- Member parties: Croatian Democratic Union (HDZ)
- Status in legislature: Single-party majority
- Opposition party: League of Communists of Croatia-Party of Democratic Changes
- Opposition leader: Ivica Račan

History
- Election: 1990 election
- Legislature term: 1990–1992
- Predecessor: 13th Executive Council of the Socialist Republic of Croatia
- Successor: Cabinet of Josip Manolić

The First Government of the Republic of Croatia (Croatian: Prva Vlada Republike Hrvatske) (from the date of formation until 25 July 1990 it was legally referred to as the 14th Executive Council of the Socialist Republic of Croatia (Croatian: Četrnaesto Izvršno vijeće Sabora Socijalističke Republike Hrvatske)) was the Croatian Government announced on 30 May 1990 after the first multi-party elections ended 45 years of Communist Party rule, but while Croatia still remained a federal unit within SFR Yugoslavia. The prime minister (formally still President of the Executive Council of SR Croatia) was Stjepan Mesić of the Croatian Democratic Union. The cabinet was reformed on 24 August 1990 when Stjepan Mesić left Zagreb to assume the Croatian seat at the Yugoslav collective presidency following armed insurrection by ethnic Serbs.

== Party breakdown ==
Party breakdown of cabinet ministers (24 August 1990):

- Note: Government secretary attended cabinet meeting and was non-partisan

- Croatian Democratic Union
25

== List of ministers and portfolios ==
Some periods in the table end after the cabinet's reorganization, when the minister listed continued in the post in the subsequent cabinet of Josip Manolić.

Name	Party	Portfolio	Period
Stjepan Mesić	HDZ	Prime Minister	30 May – 24 August 1990
Bernardo Jurlina	HDZ	Deputy Prime Minister	31 May 1990 – 4 March 1991
Mate Babić	HDZ	Deputy Prime Minister	31 May – 8 November 1990
Milan Ramljak	HDZ	Deputy Prime Minister	31 May 1990 – 12 August 1992
Stjepan Zdunić	HDZ	Minister of Social Planning	31 May – 10 October 1990
Božo Udovičić	HDZ	Minister of Energy and Industry	31 May 1990 – 17 July 1991
Marijan Hanžeković	HDZ	Minister of Finance	25 July 1990 – 17 July 1991
Milan Hrnjak	HDZ	Minister of Construction, Housing-Communal Works, and Protection of Human Environment	31 May 1990 – 4 March 1991
Milovan Šibl	HDZ	Minister of Information	31 May 1990 – 4 March 1991
Zdravko Mršić	HDZ	Minister of Foreign Affairs	31 May – 8 November 1990
Petar Kriste	HDZ	Minister of Defence	31 May – 24 August 1990
Ivan Tarnaj	HDZ	Minister of Agriculture, Forestry and Water Resources	31 May 1990 – 12 August 1992
Davorin Rudolf	HDZ	Minister of Maritime Affairs	25 July – 24 August 1990
Branko Babac	HDZ	Minister of Justice and Administration	28 June 1990 – 17 July 1991
Josip Božičević	HDZ	Minister of Transportation	25 July 1990 – 12 August 1992
Vlatko Pavletić	HDZ	Minister of Education, Culture and Sport	31 May 1990 – 15 April 1992
Marin Črnja	HDZ	Minister of Labour, Veterans and Disabled Issues	31 May 1990 – 4 March 1991
Janko Vranyczany-Dobrinović	HDZ	Minister of Tourism	25 July 1990 – 17 July 1991
Josip Boljkovac	HDZ	Minister of the Interior	31 May 1990 – 2 July 1991
Andrija Hebrang	HDZ	Minister of Health	30 May 1990 – 12 August 1992
Osman Muftić	HDZ	Minister of Science, Technology and Informatics	30 May 1990 – 31 July 1991
Branko Bergman	HDZ	Minister of Water Resources	25 July 1990 – 17 July 1991
Zvonimir Medvedović	HDZ	Minister without portfolio	30 May – 25 July 1990
Zvonimir Medvedović	HDZ	Minister of Commercial Exchange	25 July – 24 August 1990
Dragutin Kalogjera	HDZ	Minister without portfolio	31 May – 4 October 1990
Gojko Šušak	HDZ	Minister of Croatian Expatriates	31 May 1990 – 17 July 1991
Vjenceslav Cvitan		Government secretary	30 May 1990 – 30 June 1991
