= Dario Hrebak =

Croatian politician (born 1981)

Member of the Croatian Parliament
- Incumbent
- Assumed office 22 July 2020
- Constituency: District II
- In office 28 December 2015 – 14 October 2016
- Constituency: District II

Mayor of Bjelovar
- Incumbent
- Assumed office 2017

Personal details
- Born: 11 September 1981 (age 44)
- Party: Croatian Social Liberal Party (since 2006)

Dario Hrebak (born 11 September 1981) is a Croatian politician serving as president of the Croatian Social Liberal Party since 2019. He has been a member of the Croatian Parliament since 2020, having previously served from 2015 to 2016. He has served as mayor of Bjelovar since 2017.
