= Krešo Beljak =

Croatian politician (born 1971)

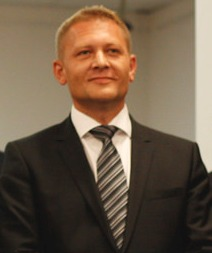

Mayor of Samobor
- In office 2009–2021
- Preceded by: Antun Dubravko Filipec
- Succeeded by: Petra Škrobot

President of the Croatian Peasant Party
- In office 19 March 2016 – 1 January 2025
- Preceded by: Branko Hrg
- Succeeded by: Darko Vuletić

Member of the Croatian Parliament
- In office 14 October 2016 – 1 April 2026
- Succeeded by: Darko Vuletić
- Constituency: VII electoral district

Personal details
- Born: 22 August 1971 (age 55) Brežice, SR Slovenia, SFR Yugoslavia
- Party: Croatian Peasant Party (2003–present)
- Children: 3
- Education: University of Zagreb
- Occupation: Politician
- Profession: Geography professor

Krešo Beljak (Croatian pronunciation: [krěːʃo bêʎaːk]; born 22 August 1971) is a Croatian politician who served as mayor of Samobor from 2009 to 2021, and a member of the Croatian Parliament from 2016 to 2025. He was also President of the Croatian Peasant Party (HSS) from 2016 to 2025.

== Early life and education ==
Krešo Beljak was born in the Slovenian town of Brežice on 22 August 1971. After finishing Janko Mišić Elementary School in the town of Samobor, he enrolled in the Nikola Tesla Education Center for Automation, Energy and Process Engineering in Zagreb. After finishing high school, he enrolled at the Zagreb Faculty of Science from which he graduated in 1999 and has become geography professor. In 2016, Beljak completed a postgraduate specialist study in Foreign Policy and Diplomacy at the Faculty of Political Science of the University of Zagreb.

Between 1990 and 1992, Beljak participated in the Croatian War of Independence as a member of the 15th Samobor Brigade for which he was decorated with the Homeland War Memorial Medal.

In March 2002 at the age of 31, Beljak was convicted at the Municipal Court in Zagreb and sentenced to a verdict of eight months in prison due to a heavy burglary in four cars, with a suspended sentence of three years which he described as: "A vaccine against future stupidity."

== Career ==
After graduation, Beljak moved to Germany where he lived and worked until 2002 when he returned to Croatia and started working as a geography professor at the Samobor Vocational High School. In 2008, he got employed as professional adviser at the Public Administration for the Management of Protected Areas and Other Protected Natural Values in the Zagreb County.

== Political career ==
Beljak became a member of the Croatian Peasant Party (HSS) in 2003. At the 2003 local committees elections he was elected as a councilor in the Council of Ferdo Livadić - Samobor Local Committee. In 2004, he became secretary of HSS Samobor branch, and in 2005 branches commissioner. In July 2005, he was elected president of the HSS branch in the "Ferdo Livadić" Local Committee. In May 2006, Beljak was elected new president of the HSS Samobor branch, winning 75% of the votes. In the same year, he became a member of the council of the HSS Zagreb County branch and later a member of the HSS Council of Experts where he was charged with creating the official party concept of the Croatian administrative division. In 2008, he was elected as one of 30 members of HSS Main Board and ipso facto served as a member of the Presidency of the HSS Zagreb County branch. At the 2009 local elections, he was elected mayor of Samobor.

In 2010, he was charged for illegal and unconstitutional formation of a parking lot in the courtyard of Perkovac 22, one of the main Samobor roads.

In January 2012, at the HSS General Assembly, he was elected as one of the five vice-presidents of the HSS with the highest number of votes of all 13 candidates. At the 2013 local elections, Beljak was re-elected as mayor. In March 2016, he was elected president of the HSS, and re-elected on 14 January 2017. In June 2016, the HSS left the centre-right Patriotic Coalition, led by the Croatian Democratic Union (HDZ). The party then signed a coalition agreement with the Social Democratic Party (SDP) for the upcoming 2016 parliamentary election and joined the centre-left People's Coalition. Due to this move, former HSS president Branko Hrg left the party. The HDZ won the election and soon formed a majority government. Beljak, who was elected to the Croatian Parliament along with four other HSS members, decided to give support to the new government "for 100 days".

At the 2017 local elections, Beljak was re-elected as mayor of Samobor for the third time.

He is in favor of abortion rights and refuses to classify the HSS as conservative, stating that "all political parties should be somewhat liberal". Under his leadership, the party moved more towards the left. In 2019, the HSS Presidency announced that they are leaving the European People's Party (EPP).

On 12 January 2020, he made a comment regarding extra-judicial assassinations of Yugoslav Communist regime's political opponents committed by the Yugoslav Secret Police (UDBA) outside Yugoslavia between 1945 and 1990, tweeting that the number of "over 100" executed was "obviously not enough", and claiming that the people who escaped UDBA's reach were "fascists" who "made all the wars from 1991 to 1999". On the following day, he deleted the tweet and issued an apology.

== Personal life ==
Beljak lives in Samobor with his wife and their three children. Along with his native Croatian, he is fluent in English and German.
