= Nedjeljko Mihanović =

Croatian politician (1930–2022)

Speaker of the Croatian Parliament
- In office 24 May 1994 – 28 November 1995
- Preceded by: Stjepan Mesić
- Succeeded by: Vlatko Pavletić

Personal details
- Born: 16 February 1930 Sitno Donje, Kingdom of Yugoslavia (modern Croatia)
- Died: 27 January 2022 (aged 91) Zagreb, Croatia
- Party: HDZ
- Education: University of Zagreb
- Profession: Philology

Nedjeljko Mihanović (Croatian pronunciation: [nědjeːʎko mixǎːnoʋit͡ɕ]; 16 February 1930 – 27 January 2022) was a Croatian politician who served as Speaker of the Croatian Parliament from 1994 to 1995. He was an associate member of the Croatian Academy of Sciences and Arts (HAZU). He retired in 2000, and died on 27 January 2022, 20 days before his 92nd birthday.
