= Pavle Kalinić =

Croatian politician and writer (born 1959)

Pavle Kalinić (born 6 June 1959) is a Croatian politician, political scientist and writer.

== Life ==
Kalinić was born in Zadar. He graduated from the Faculty of Political Science of the University of Zagreb in 1982. In 1985, he received his master's degree in International Relations. He worked as an assistant professor at the University of Political Science from 1986 to 1987, and at the College of Technical Science from 1987 to 1991. In 1989-1990, as an assistant at the Faculty of Political Science, he participated in the scientific project "Characteristics of Political Behavior in the Region". In 1989 he founded Fokus, the first independent magazine in Croatia, which was published until the end of 1990.

In 1991, he participated in the Croatian War of Independence as an army officer. He underwent medical treatment in the US after being wounded on the battlefield. He resided in the United States the following two years, returning to Croatia in 1994. He worked for the Croatian Helsinki Committee for Human Rights in 1994 and 1995. In 1997, he became a member of the Zagreb City Assembly, as well as a member of the Croatian Parliament in 2000.

During 2004 and 2005, he was the director of Profil International, the largest book publisher and retailer in Croatia. In 2006, he became head of the Department of Education, Culture and Sports in Zagreb; since 2006, he is the head of the Zagreb Office of Emergency Management. He is a member of PEN.

== Works ==
Kalinić is the author of seven fiction books and three political non-fiction books. His articles and columns have been published in several Croatian newspapers and magazine. He wrote introductions for several books translated into Croatian, such as The Third Way by Tony Blair, Clash of Fundamentalisms by Tariq Ali, Disarming Iraq by Hans Blix, and The Fateful Triangle by Noam Chomsky. In July 2012, he obtained his PhD with the thesis "The politics of G.W. Bush Administration and Islamic Terrorism".

Some of his scientific and expert works (in Croatian):

- Terrorism: A History of the Red Brigades, Solidarnost, No. 12, year 4, 1983.
- The New Elite: Old Puppets in New Clothes, Hrvatska revija, magazine of Matica hrvatska, No. 2-3, year 50, 2000.
- Definition of "Terrorism" in the Leaden Years, Hrvatska revija, the magazine of Matica hrvatska, No. 1, year 50, 2000.
- Secular Roots of Modern Islamism, Profil, 2015
