= Hudovo =

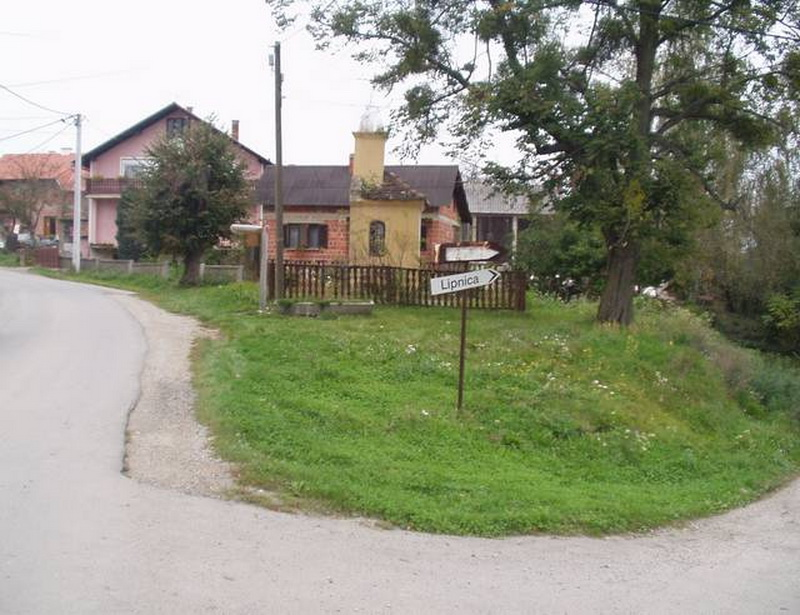
- Interactive map of Hudovo
- Municipality: Rakovec

Area
  - Total: 2.0 km^{2} (0.77 sq mi)

Population (2021)
  - Total: 74
  - Density: 37/km^{2} (96/sq mi)
- Time zone: UTC+1 (CET)
  - Summer (DST): UTC+2 (CEST)

Hudovo is a village in Croatia.
