= Vilim Herman =

Croatian jurist and politician

Personal details
- Born: 19 January 1949 (age 77) Osijek, PR Croatia, Yugoslavia
- Education: University of Belgrade Faculty of Law

Vilim Herman (born 19 January 1949) is a Croatian jurist and politician. A former representative in the Croatian Parliament, he serves as a professor of law at the University of Osijek.

== Early life ==
Herman was born in Osijek to a Jewish family. The first written records of his family date back to 1832, when his great-grandfather moved to Osijek from Warsaw, Poland. Herman's great-grandfather was a merchant who owned a trade business "S. Weiss & D. Herrmann" in Osijek district Donji grad. His father, Maks Herman, advised him to study law. Herman earned his degree from the University of Belgrade's Law School

== Political career ==
Herman has been member of the Croatian Social Liberal Party since 1990. In the 2nd assembly of Sabor, Herman was elected to fill a minority quota as a Jewish representative, in the Croatian Social Liberal Party (HSLS) electoral list.

In the 4th assembly of Sabor, Herman was a member of the HSLS, and after that the Party of Liberal Democrats (LIBRA). In the 5th assembly of Sabor, he was a member of LIBRA, then of HNS-LD, and in 2005 he joined the Slavonia-Baranja Croatian Party.
