= Podgorica club =

Club of Balkan presidents and prime ministers

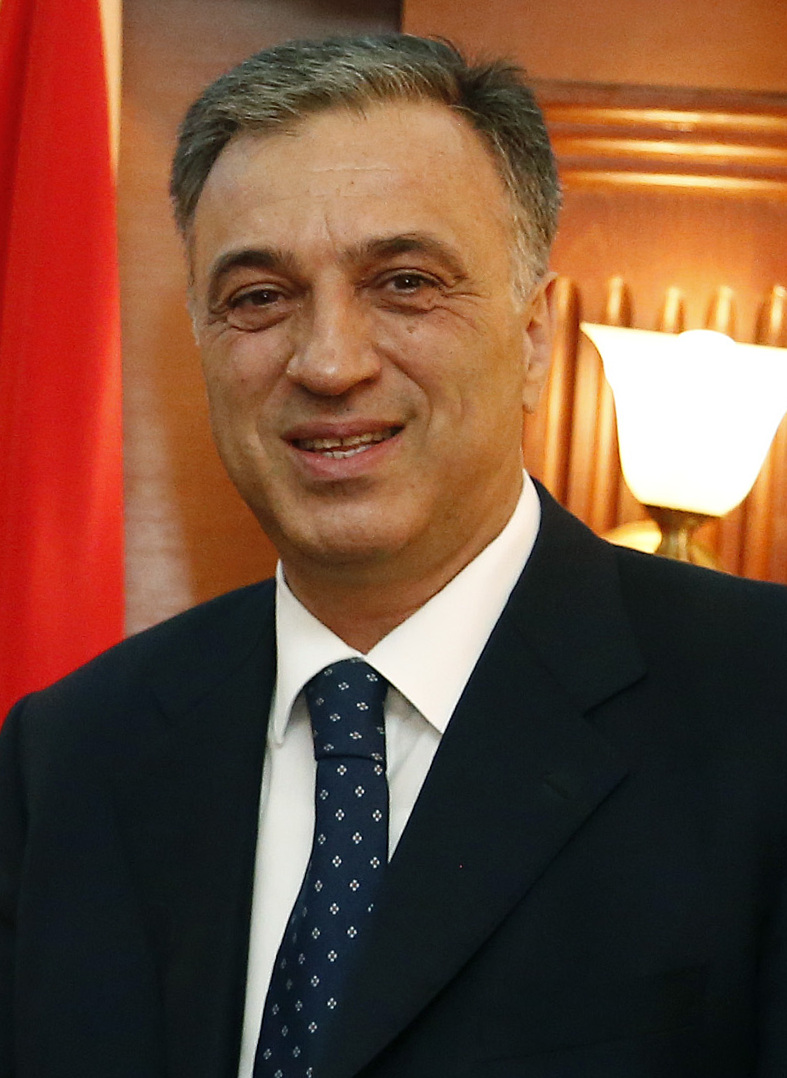
Filip Vujanović, former president of Montenegro

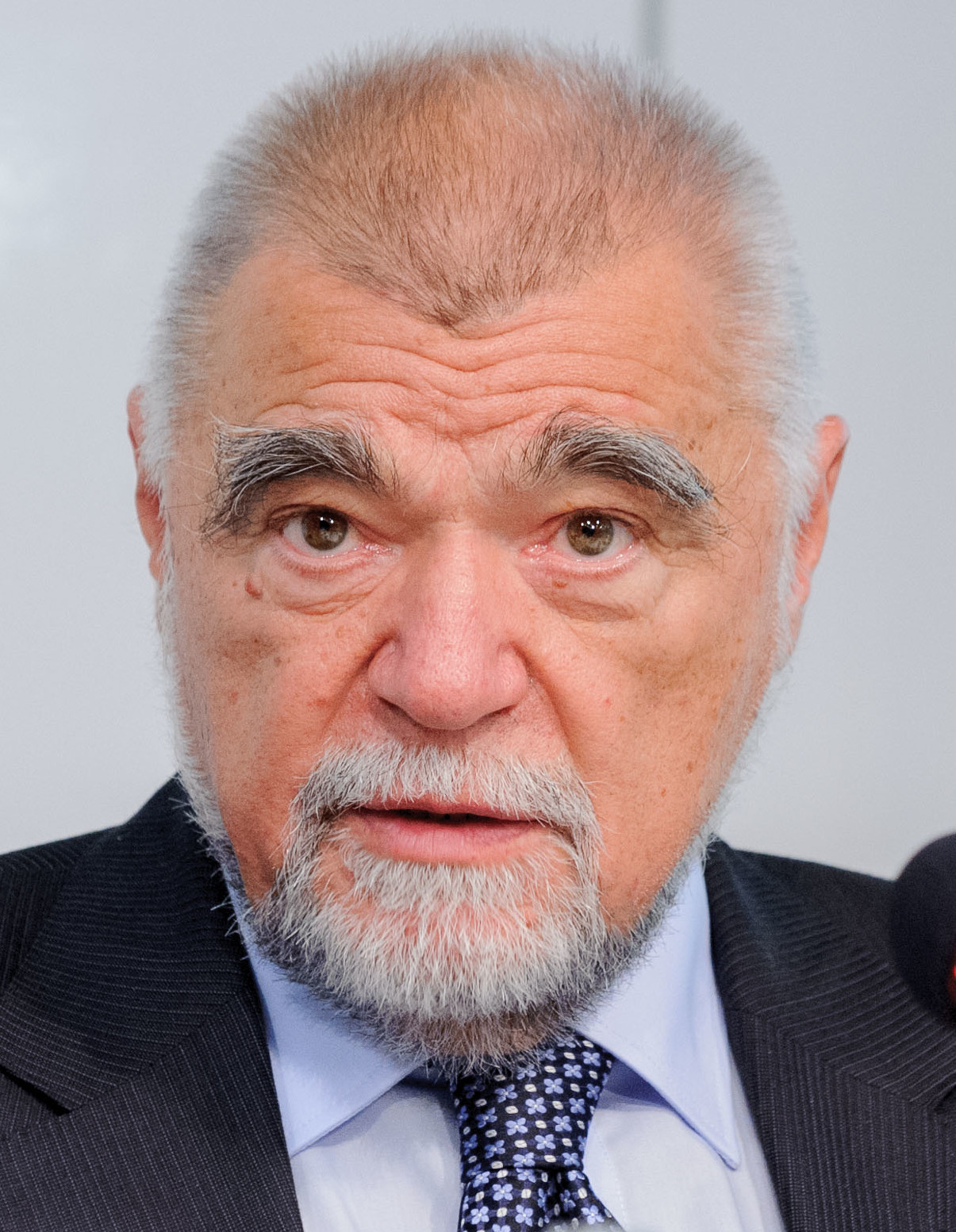
Stjepan Mesić, former president of Croatia

The Podgorica club was founded at the beginning of 2019 in Podgorica, Montenegro. Members of the Podgorica club are former presidents and prime ministers of the countries of the Balkan region, such as former Montenegrin president Filip Vujanović, former Bosnian prime minister Zlatko Lagumdžija, former Slovenian president Danilo Türk, former Croatian president Stjepan Mesić, former Serbian president Nataša Mićić, former Albanian president Alfred Moisiu and other prominent politicians from the Balkans area.

== History ==
Among other politicians, former NATO Secretary General Anders Fogh Rasmussen and former Swedish Prime Minister Carl Bild took part in the panel, and the peace initiative for the Western Balkans was presented. The founding of the Podgorica club was also supported by the former High Representative of the European Council Mogherini. In the 2019 joint declaration, the Podgorica club supported regional cooperation, the continuation of political reforms in the European Union (EU) and the perspective of EU expansion to the countries of the Western Balkans.

== Cooperation with Universal Peace Federation ==
At the end of 2019, a summit organized by the UPF was held in Tirana, Albania, where peace in the Balkans was discussed, and among the speakers were former President of Albania Moisiu, President of Kosovo Thaci, President of North Macedonia Pendarovski, and other politicians from the Balkans. At the 2020 summit in South Korea, one panel was dedicated to the Balkan Peace Initiative launched by the Universal Peace Federation.

In 2021, the Podgorica club and the Universal Peace Federation signed a memorandum of cooperation, with the aim of promoting peace and cooperation in global peace initiatives. In the declaration from 2022, the Podgorica club supported the common regional market and the perspective of the accession of the countries of the Western Balkans to the EU, according to the individual achievements of each individual country. A conference was held in Albania in 2022 organized by the Podgorica club and the Universal Peace Federation on the topic of peace and economic development in the Western Balkans. The political and economic cooperation of the countries of the Western Balkans was discussed. At the end of the conference, the Declaration on peace and development of the countries of the Western Balkans was adopted.

Former president Vujanović and former Albanian president Moisiu attended a Peace Summit organized by the Universal Peace Federation, expressing gratitude over a successful partnership in affirming the value of cooperation and peace in the international community.

Former Montenegrin President Vujanovic, former Albanian President Moisiu, former Croatian President Mesic, former Bosnian President Mladen Ivanic, former Kosovo President Sejdiu and former Serbian President Micic participated in the conference. This joint conference of the Universal Peace Federation and the Podgorica club was held after the international conference in South Korea, on the topic of peace on the Korean Peninsula, and was jointly organized by the Universal Peace Federation and the Kingdom of Cambodia. The conference was attended by former United Nations Secretary General Moon, former United States President Trump, former United States Vice President Mike Pence, former US Secretary of State Mike Pompeo, former Presidents of the European Council Romano Prodi and José Manuel Barroso, members of the Podgorica club Vujanovic and Ivanic and numerous other former presidents and prime ministers.
