= Muhamed Zulić =

Croatian politician

Muhamed Zulić (5 July 1928 – 16 October 2008) was a Croatian politician.

He was a representative in the Croatian Parliament in its second assembly. From July 31, 1991 to August 12, 1992 he served as a minister without portfolio in the Croatian Government of National Unity as a member of the Croatian Democratic Union. During the Croatian War of Independence he was held by rebel Serb forces in Banovina for 25 days. He was freed on November 11, 1991.

In 1993 Zulić represented the parliament at the Bleiburg commemoration. Zulić donated Ivan Meštrović's work Milan Milic to the Ivan Meštrović Foundation in 2005.

He was awarded with Homeland War Memorial Medal and with Order of Ante Starčević.
