= Zvonimir Mršić =

Croatian politician (born 1966)

Zvonimir Mršić (born 9 January 1966) is a Croatian manager, former CEO of food company Podravka and a former member of the Croatian Parliament.

Mršić was born in Koprivnica. He graduated from the Faculty of Political Science of the University of Zagreb in 1990. He is a member of the Social Democratic Party of Croatia. From 1997 to 1999 Mršić was deputy mayor and from 2001 to 2012 mayor of Koprivnica. He was a member of parliament from 22 December 2003 to 24 February 2012. Between 2012 and 2017, Mršić was the CEO of Podravka.

== Publications ==
- Zvonimir Mršić (June 19, 2015). "Turning a Company Around: 5 Leadership Lessons From the CEO of Podravka". The Huffington Post.
- Zvonimir Mršić (August 27, 2015). "Why Manufacturing Companies Must Embrace Disruptive Change to Survive". The Huffington Post.
- Zvonimir Mršić (October 5, 2015). "How Corporations Can Help Ease Europe's Refugee Crisis". The Huffington Post.
