= Josip Friščić =

Croatian politician (1949–2016)

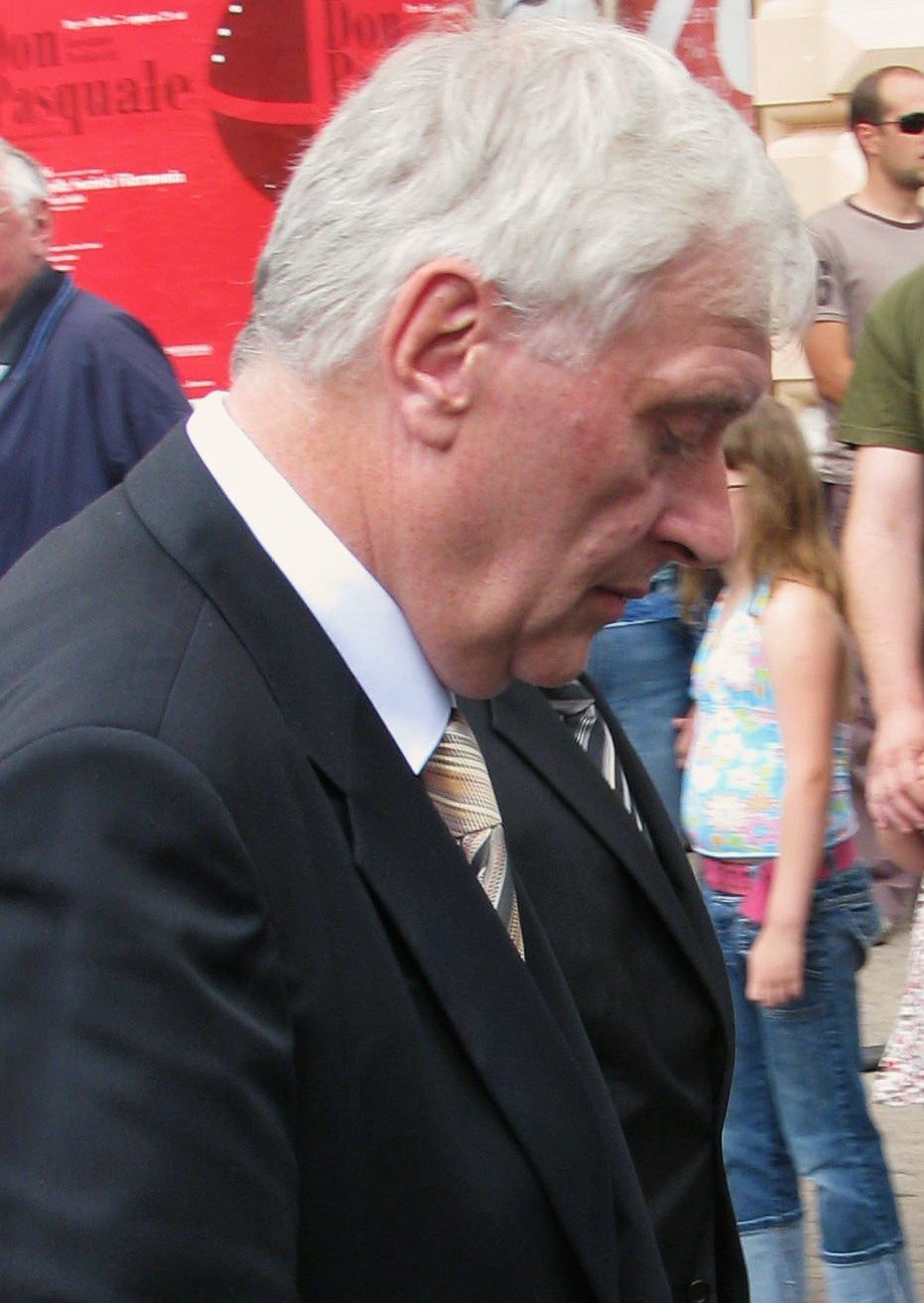

President of the Croatian Peasant Party
- In office 17 December 2005 – 28 January 2012
- Preceded by: Zlatko Tomčić
- Succeeded by: Branko Hrg

Deputy speaker of the Croatian Parliament
- In office 2008–2011

Prefect of the Koprivnica-Križevci County
- In office 2001–2008
- Succeeded by: Darko Koren

Member of the Croatian Parliament from 2nd electoral district
- In office 2008–2012

Personal details
- Born: 15 August 1949 Subotica Podravska near Rasinja, PR Croatia, FPR Yugoslavia (modern Croatia)
- Died: 23 January 2016 (aged 66)
- Party: Croatian Peasant Party

Josip Friščić (15 August 1949 – 23 January 2016) was a Croatian politician. He was a leader of the Croatian Peasant Party (HSS) and Deputy speaker of the Croatian Parliament from 2008 until 2011.

Friščić joined the party in 1992 and subsequently established many local branches. After many years of active political work, he was elected as president of the party in 2005. He resigned in 2012. He was suffering from a rare form of cancer, and died on 23 January 2016.

Party political offices
Preceded by Zlatko Tomčić	President of Croatian Peasant Party; December 2005 – January 2012	Succeeded by Branko Hrg
