= Sitno Donje =

Coordinates: 43°40′44″N 16°07′20″E

- Interactive map of Sitno Donje

Sitno Donje is a village near Šibenik, Croatia. In the 2011 census, it had 561 inhabitants.
