= Zlatko Tomčić =

Croatian politician (born 1945)

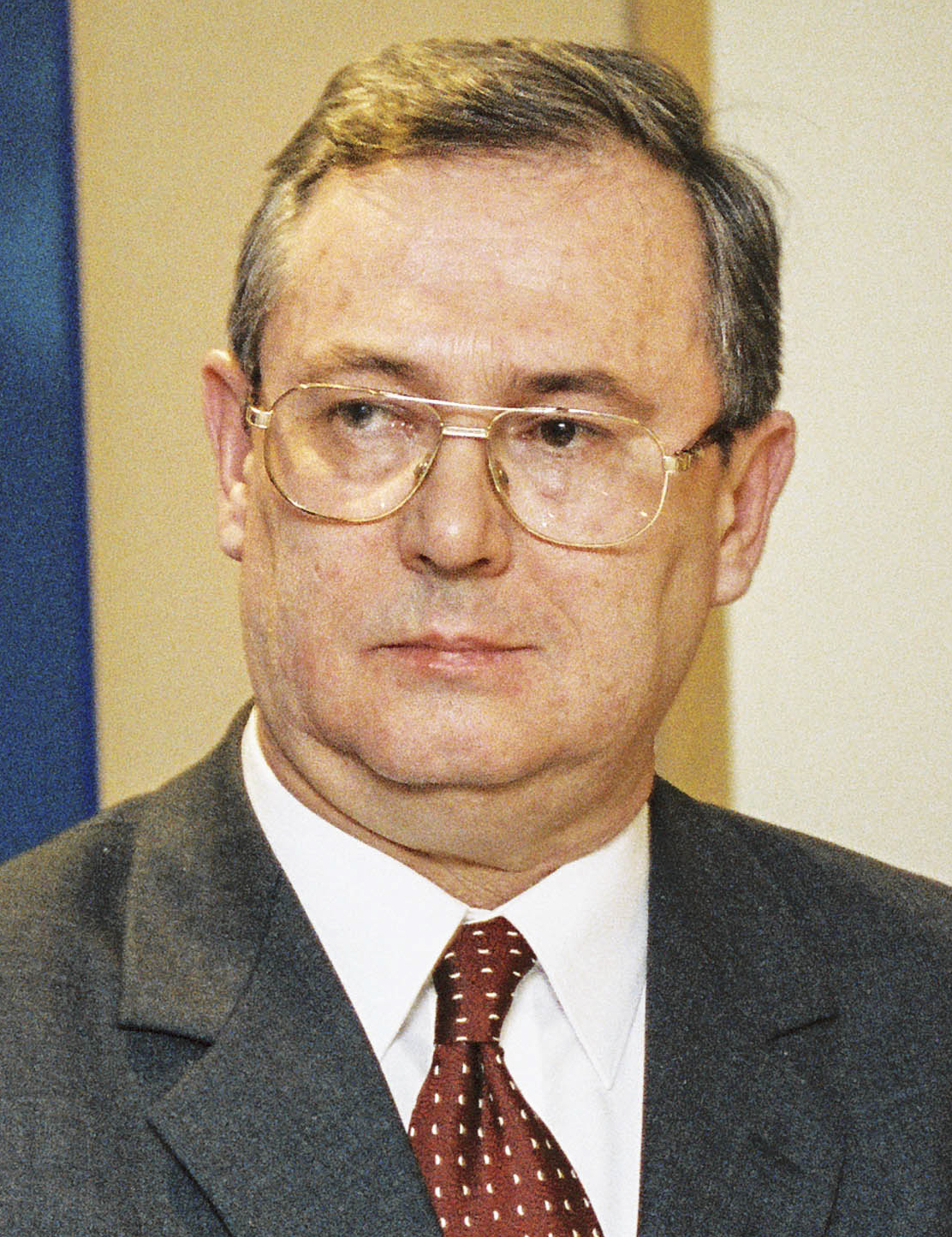
- Tomčić in 2003

Acting President of Croatia
- In office 2 February 2000 – 18 February 2000
- Prime Minister: Ivica Račan
- Preceded by: Vlatko Pavletić (acting)
- Succeeded by: Stjepan Mesić

Speaker of the Croatian Parliament
- In office 2 February 2000 – 22 December 2003
- Preceded by: Vlatko Pavletić
- Succeeded by: Vladimir Šeks

Minister of Construction and Environment
- In office 3 April 1993 – 31 December 1994
- Prime Minister: Nikica Valentić
- Preceded by: Zdenko Karakaš
- Succeeded by: Marina Matulović-Dropulić (as Minister of Physical Planning, Construction and Housing)
Further offices held
President of the Croatian Peasant Party
In office 1994–2005
Preceded by	Drago Stipac
Succeeded by	Josip Friščić
Member of the Croatian Parliament
In office 1995 – 10 October 2006
Succeeded by	Miroslav Čačija
Constituency	II electoral district

Personal details
- Born: 10 July 1945 (age 81) Zagreb, PR Croatia, FPR Yugoslavia (modern Croatia)
- Party: Croatian Peasant Party
- Spouse: Slavica Tomčić
- Children: 2, including Martina
- Education: University of Belgrade

Zlatko Tomčić (pronounced [zlâtko tǒːmt͡ʃit͡ɕ]; born 10 July 1945) is a Croatian former politician who served as acting president of Croatia from 2 to 18 February 2000.

He also served as minister of construction and environment in the government of Nikica Valentić from 1993 to 1994, president of the Croatian Peasant Party (HSS) from 1994 to 2005, and speaker of the Croatian Parliament from 2000 to 2003.

== Biography ==
Born on 10 July 1945 in Zagreb, Tomčić graduated from the Belgrade Faculty of Civil Engineering.

Tomčić became president of the Croatian Peasant Party (HSS) in 1994 while serving as Minister of Construction and Environment in the HDZ-led cabinet of Nikica Valentić. Under his leadership, the Peasant Party led the coalition that came in second in the 1995 election, winning 18 seats, of which 10 went to members of the HSS, including Tomčić.

In the 2000 election, the HSS-led coalition came in third, winning 25 seats, of which 17 went to the HSS. These parties joined with the election winners (SDP-HSLS coalition) to form the government, and Tomčić became Speaker of the Parliament. He was instated on 2 February 2000.

As speaker of the Parliament, Tomčić also briefly served as acting president of Croatia, as the post was at the time vacant due to the death of president Franjo Tuđman in December 1999. He gave up the position to the newly elected president Stjepan Mesić on 19 February 2000.

Tomčić remained speaker until December 2003, following new elections where the party lost seats and went into the opposition. Tomčić did, however, keep a seat in the Parliament.

In 2005, the HSS ten-member club in the Parliament split between a group supporting Tomčić and another one insisting on change in leadership. In the party election of December 2005, Tomčić was opposed by Josip Friščić and defeated. After defeat he gave up his parliament seat and left politics.

As of 2011, Tomčić is the CEO of a small architecture firm.

Party political offices
Preceded by Drago Stipac	President of Croatian Peasant Party; December 1994 – December 2005	Succeeded by Josip Friščić
Political offices
Preceded by Vlatko Pavletić; Acting	Speaker of the Croatian Parliament; 2 February 2000 –23 December 2003	Succeeded by Vladimir Šeks
Preceded by Vlatko Pavletić Acting	President of Croatia (acting); 2 February 2000 – 18 February 2000	Succeeded by Stjepan Mesić
