= Stjepan Mesić =

President of Croatia from 2000 to 2010

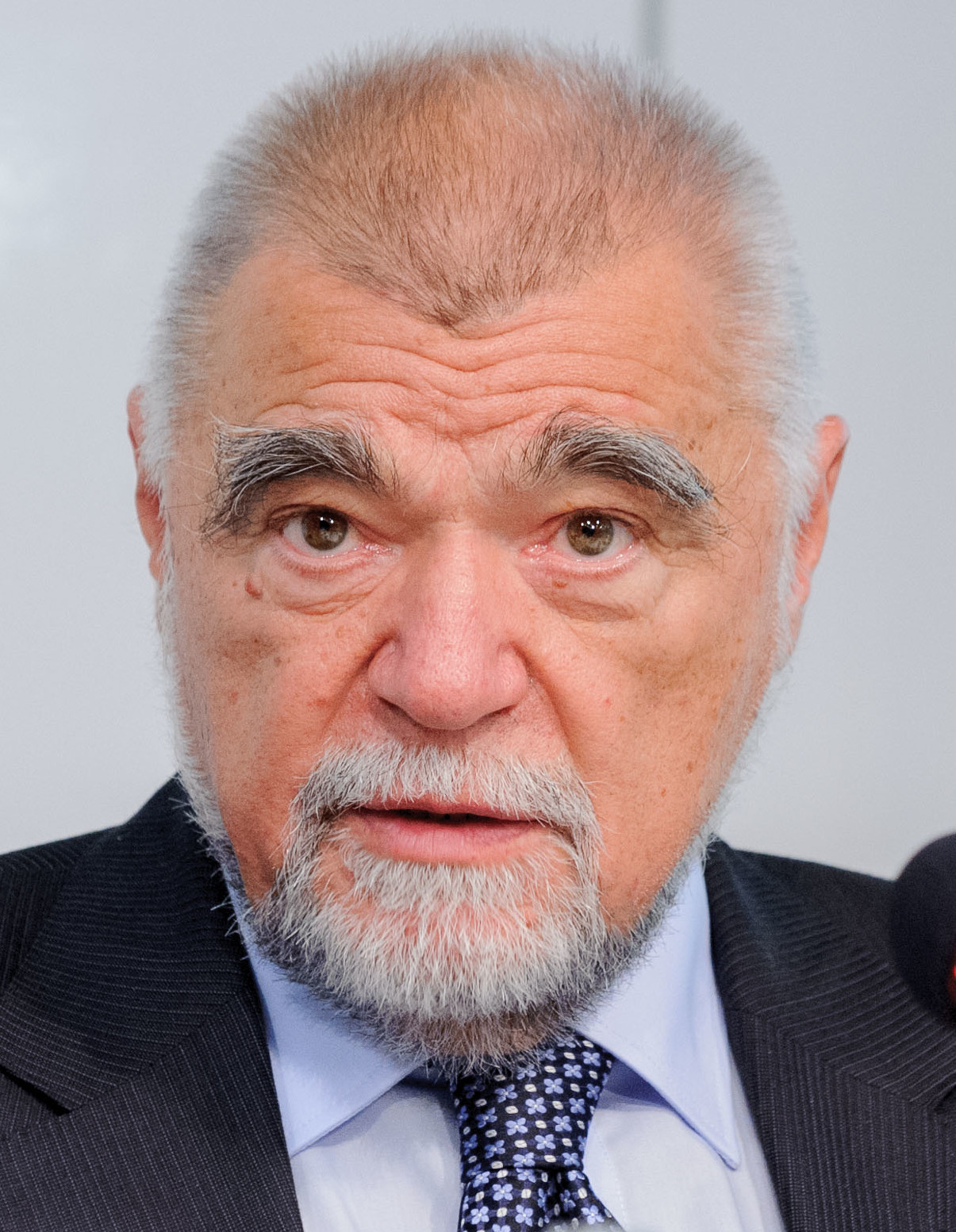
- Mesić in 2012

President of Croatia
- In office 19 February 2000 – 18 February 2010
- Prime Minister: Ivica Račan; Ivo Sanader; Jadranka Kosor
- Preceded by: Franjo Tuđman; Zlatko Tomčić (acting)
- Succeeded by: Ivo Josipović

Speaker of the Croatian Parliament
- In office 7 September 1992 – 24 May 1994
- President: Franjo Tuđman
- Preceded by: Žarko Domljan
- Succeeded by: Nedjeljko Mihanović

13th President of the Presidency of Yugoslavia
- In office 30 June 1991 – 6 December 1991
- Prime Minister: Ante Marković
- Deputy: Branko Kostić
- Preceded by: Borisav Jović; Sejdo Bajramović (Acting)
- Succeeded by: Position abolished^{a}

Vice-President of the Presidency of Yugoslavia
- In office 24 August 1990 – 15 May 1991
- President: Borisav Jović
- Prime Minister: Ante Marković
- Preceded by: Stipe Šuvar
- Succeeded by: Branko Kostić

Member of the Presidency of Yugoslavia for the Republic of Croatia
- In office 24 August 1990 – 6 December 1991
- President: Borisav Jović; Sejdo Bajramović; Himself
- Preceded by: Stipe Šuvar
- Succeeded by: Position abolished

Prime Minister of Croatia
- In office 30 May 1990 – 24 August 1990
- President: Franjo Tuđman
- Preceded by: Antun Milović
- Succeeded by: Josip Manolić

Secretary of the Non-Aligned Movement
- In office 30 June 1991 – 6 December 1991
- Preceded by: Borisav Jović
- Succeeded by: Branko Kostić

Personal details
- Born: 24 December 1934 (age 91) Orahovica, Kingdom of Yugoslavia (modern Croatia)
- Party: Independent (2000–present)
- Other political affiliations: SKH (1955–1990); HDZ (1990–1994); HND (1994–1997); HNS (1997–2000)
- Spouse: Milka Dudunić (m. 1961; died 2024)
- Children: 2
- Education: University of Zagreb
- Profession: Lawyer
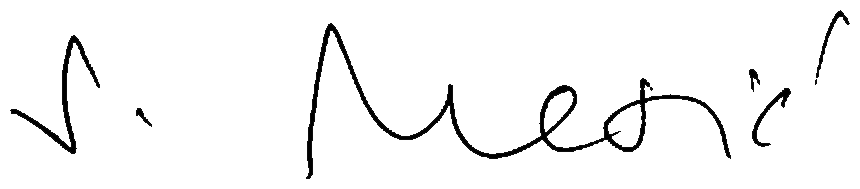
- Signature
- ^{a} Branko Kostić assumed the powers and duties of the office as acting president upon Mesić's resignation

Stjepan "Stipe" Mesić (pronounced [stjêpan stǐːpe měːsit͡ɕ]; born 24 December 1934) is a Croatian lawyer and politician who served as the president of Croatia from 2000 to 2010. Before serving two five-year terms as president, he was prime minister of SR Croatia (1990) after the first multi-party elections, the last president of the Presidency of Yugoslavia (1991) and consequently secretary general of the Non-Aligned Movement (1991), as well as the speaker of the Croatian Parliament (1992–1994), and mayor of his hometown of Orahovica.

Mesić was a deputy in the Croatian Parliament in the 1960s, and was then absent from politics until 1990 when he joined the Croatian Democratic Union (HDZ), and was named President of the Executive Council (Prime Minister) of the Socialist Republic of Croatia (then still a constituent republic of the SFR Yugoslavia) after HDZ won the elections. His cabinet is, despite holding office before Croatia's independence, considered by the Government of Croatia to have been the first government cabinet of the current Croatian republic. He later resigned from his post and was appointed to serve as the Socialist Republic of Croatia's membership of the Yugoslav federal presidency where he served first as vice president and then in 1991 as the last President of Yugoslavia before Yugoslavia dissolved.

Following the breakup of Yugoslavia and Croatia's independence, Mesić served as Speaker of the Croatian Parliament from 1992 to 1994, when he left HDZ. With several other members of parliament, he formed a new party called Croatian Independent Democrats (HND). In 1997 the majority of HND members, including Mesić, merged into the Croatian People's Party (HNS).

After Franjo Tuđman died in December 1999, Mesić won the elections to become the next president of Croatia in February 2000. He was the last Croatian president to serve under a strong semi-presidential system, which foresaw the president as the most powerful official in the government structure and allowed him to appoint and dismiss the Prime Minister and his cabinet. This system was abolished in favor of an incomplete parliamentary system, which retained the direct election of the president but greatly reduced his powers in favor of strengthening the office of Prime Minister. He was reelected in January 2005 for a second five-year term. Mesić always topped the polls for the most popular politician in Croatia during his two terms.

== Early life and education ==
Stjepan Mesić, commonly called "Stipe", was born in Orahovica, Yugoslavia (modern day Croatia) to Josip and Magdalena (née Pernar) Mesić. After his mother died in 1936, his older sister Marija was sent to their uncle Tomo Pernar in France, while Stjepan was put in the care of his grandmother Marija until his father was remarried in 1938 to Mileva Jović, an ethnic Serb who gave birth to Slavko and Jelica.

His father joined the Yugoslav Partisans in 1941. The Mesić family spent most of the Second World War in refuges in Mount Papuk and Orahovica when it was occasionally liberated. In 1945, the family took refuge from the final fighting of the war in Hungary, along with 10,000 other refugees, and subsequently settled in Našice, where Josip Mesić became the chairman of the District Council. The family soon moved to Osijek, where Stipe graduated from 4-year elementary school and finished two years of 8-year gymnasium.

In 1949, his father was reassigned back to Orahovica, and Stipe continued his education at the gymnasium in Požega. He graduated in 1955 and, as an exemplary student, was admitted to the League of Communists of Yugoslavia. The same year on 17 March, his father died of cancer.

Stjepan Mesić continued his studies at the Law Faculty at the University of Zagreb, where he graduated in 1961. That same year, Mesić married Milka Dudunić, of Ukrainian and Serbian ethnic origin from Hrvatska Kostajnica, with whom he has two daughters. After graduation, he worked as an intern at the municipal court in Orahovica and the public attorney's office at Našice. He served his compulsory military service in Bileća and Niš, becoming a reserve officer.

== Career ==
In 1966, Mesić ran as an independent candidate in the election for his municipal council, and defeated two other candidates. In 1967, he became the mayor of Orahovica and a member of the Parliament of SR Croatia.

In 1967, as mayor, Mesić attempted the building of a private factory in the town, the first private factory in Yugoslavia. However, this was personally denounced by Yugoslav president Josip Broz Tito as an attempt to silently introduce capitalism, which was illegal under the then-existing constitution.

=== Croatian spring ===
In 1967, when a group of Croatian nationalists published Declaration on the Status and Name of the Croatian Literary Language, Mesić publicly denounced it as a diversionary attack against the very foundations of Yugoslavia and called for its authors to be prosecuted by law.

However, in the 1970s Mesić supported the reformist Croatian Spring movement which called for Croatian equality within the Yugoslav Federation on economic, political and cultural levels. The government indicted him for "acts of enemy propaganda". The initial trial lasted three days in which 55 witnesses testified, only five against him, but he was sentenced to 20 years in jail on charges that he was a member of a Croatian terrorist group. He appealed and the trial was prolonged, but in 1975 he was incarcerated for one year and served his sentence at the Stara Gradiška prison.

=== Return to politics ===
Mesić was elected again in 1990 as a candidate of the Croatian Democratic Union (HDZ) in the first multi-party elections in Croatia after World War II. He became the general secretary of HDZ and later the Prime Minister of Croatia. He served in this post from May to August 1990, when he resigned to become the vice-president of the Socialist Federal Republic of Yugoslavia (SFRY).

Presidents rotated annually among the six republics of Yugoslavia. When Mesić's turn came to become president on 15 May 1991, the Serbian incumbent Member Borisav Jović demanded, against all constitutional rules, that an election be held. The members from Serbia and its provinces voted against, and the member from Montenegro abstained, leaving Mesić one vote short of the majority. Under pressure from the international community after the Ten-Day War in Slovenia, Mesić was appointed on 1 July 1991.

As Yugoslav President, Mesić also held the position of Secretary General of the Non-Aligned Movement, superseding Jović. In October 1991, at the height of Siege of Dubrovnik, Mesić and Croatian Prime Minister Franjo Gregurić led a relief convoy of forty fishing and tour boats to Dubrovnik.

Despite being the head of state of the SFRY, Mesić did not attend many sessions of the collective presidency as it was dominated by four members loyal to Serbia. He was also unable to re-assert control as commander-in-chief of the Yugoslav People's Army, as his orders for them to return to barracks were ignored and they acted independently. On 5 December 1991, Mesić declared his post irrelevant and resigned from the Presidency, returning to Croatia. In a statement to Croatian Parliament, he said: "I think I've accomplished my duty, Yugoslavia no longer exist[s] anymore".

After 1992 Croatian parliamentary election, Mesić became the Speaker of the Croatian Parliament. He served as the Speaker from 7 September 1992 to 24 May 1994.

In April 1994, Mesić left the HDZ and formed a new party with Josip Manolić, the Croatian Independent Democrats (Hrvatski Nezavisni Demokrati, HND). Mesić stated that this decision was motivated by his disagreement with Croatia's policy in Bosnia and Herzegovina at the time, specifically Franjo Tuđman's alleged agreement with Slobodan Milošević in the Milošević–Tuđman Karađorđevo meeting to carve up Bosnia and Herzegovina between Croatia and Serbia and the subsequent launch of the Croat–Bosniak War.

Earlier, in 1992, Mesić visited Široki Brijeg in order to dismiss Stjepan Kljujić and install Mate Boban as the president of HDZ BiH, the party's branch in Bosnia and Herzegovina. Mesić later described Boban as a radical nationalist and even "crazy".

Mesić criticized the failed policies of privatization during the war and unresolved cases of war profiteering. In 1997 he and a part of the HND membership merged into the liberal Croatian People's Party (HNS), where Mesić became an executive vice-president.

=== Presidency of Croatia ===
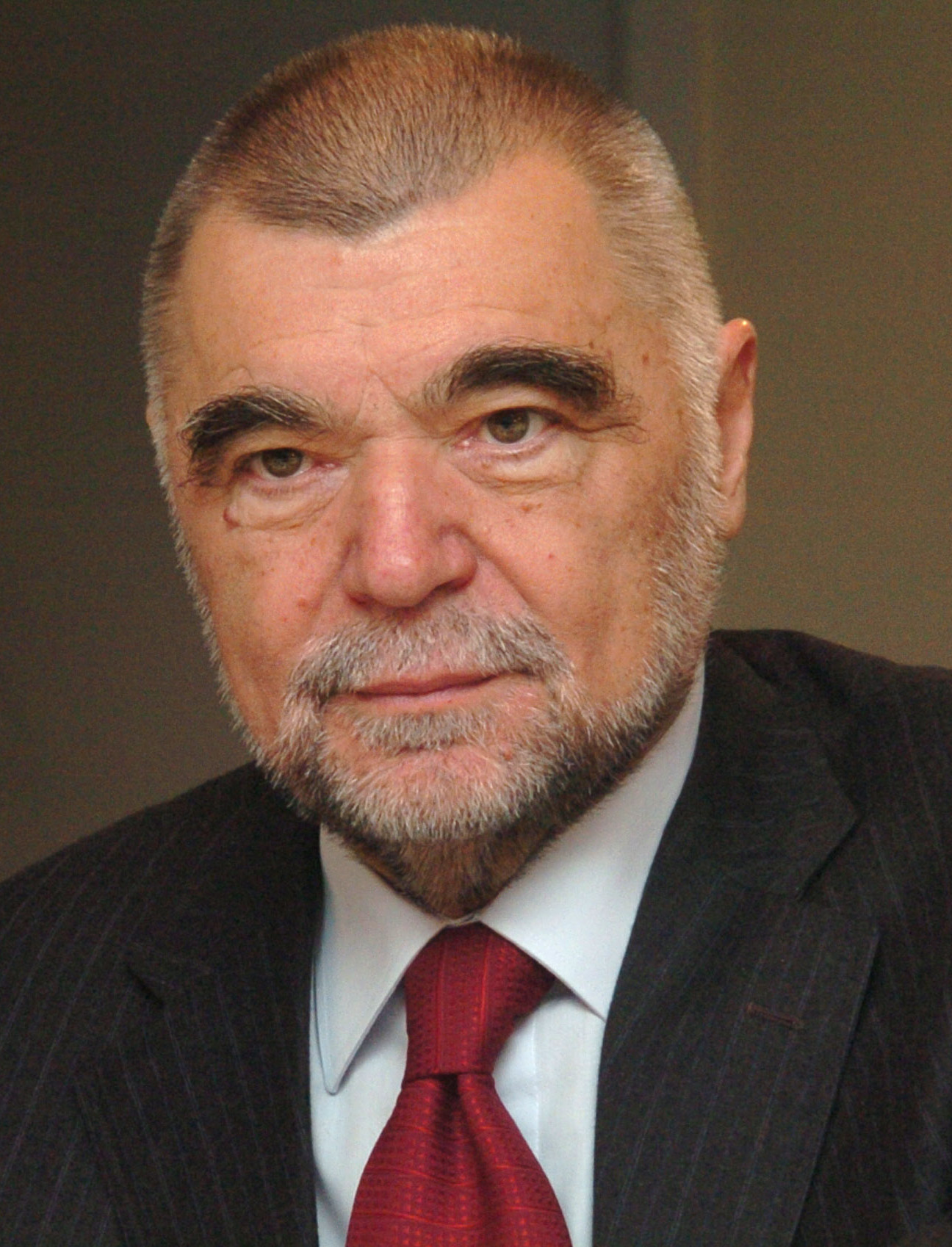
Mesić in 2004

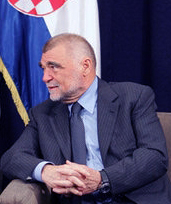
Mesić during a May 2006 meeting with then-US Vice President Dick Cheney in Dubrovnik

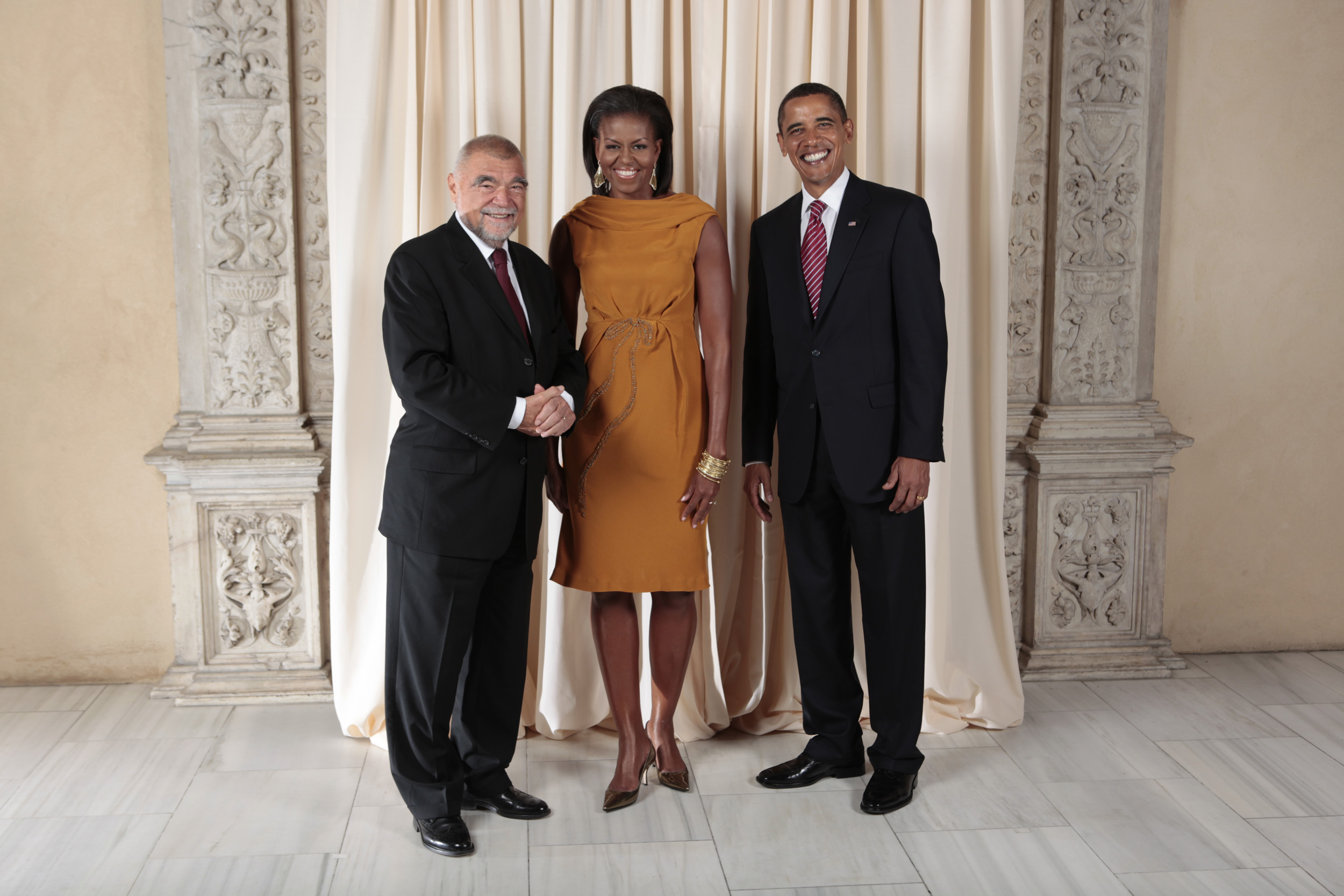
Mesić with Michelle and Barack Obama in New York City in September 2009.

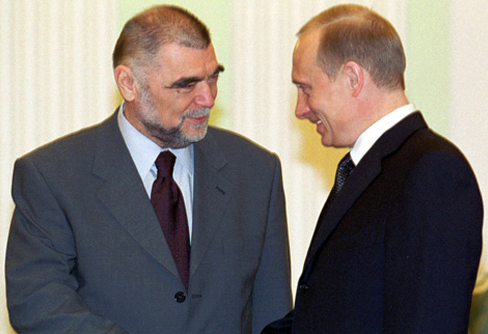
Mesić with President of Russia Vladimir Putin at the Kremlin on 16 April 2002

Mesić was elected President of the Republic of Croatia in the 2000 election after winning the first round and defeating Dražen Budiša of HSLS in the second round. Mesić ran as the joint candidate of the HNS, HSS, LS and IDS. He received 41% of the vote in the first round and 56% in the second round.

Mesić heavily criticized former President Franjo Tuđman's policies as "nationalistic and authoritarian", lacking a free media and employing bad economics, while Mesić favored a more liberal approach to opening the Croatian economy to foreign investment. In September 2000 Mesić retired seven Croatian active generals who had written two open letters to the public arguing that the current government administration "is campaigning to criminalize Homeland War and that the Government is accusing and neglecting the Croatian Army". Mesić held that active duty officers could not write public political letters without approval of their Commander-in-Chief. Opposition parties condemned this as a dangerous decision that could harm Croatian national security. Mesić later retired four more generals for similar reasons.

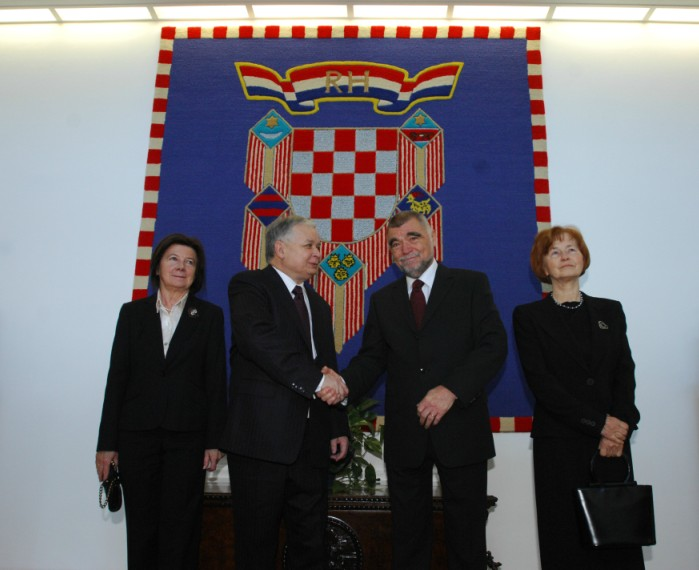
President Mesić and First Lady Milka Mesić with Polish President Lech Kaczynski and his wife Maria Kaczyńska at the Presidential Palace in Zagreb in 2008

As president, Mesić was active in foreign policy. Mesić promoted Croatia's ambition to become a member of the European Union and NATO. He also initiated mutual apologies for possible war crimes with the President of Serbia and Montenegro. After Constitutional amendments in September 2000, he was deprived of most of his roles in domestic policy-making, which instead passed wholly to the Croatian Government and its Premier.

Mesić testified at the International Criminal Tribunal for the Former Yugoslavia that implicated the Croatian army in the war in Bosnia and Herzegovina. The right-wing parts of the Croatian public took issue with this, saying that his testimony contained untrue statements and questioned his motives (he was often branded "traitor"), and noting that much of his testimony occurred before his presidency, as an opposition politician. His denunciation of the assassination of Serbian Prime Minister Zoran Djindjic on 12 March 2003 marked a notable thawing of relations with Serbia, and he attended his funeral in Belgrade.

He opposed the United States' military campaign against Iraq and Saddam Hussein's regime without gaining United Nations approval or mandate beforehand. Immediately following the invasion of Iraq on 20 March 2003, Mesić deplored that by attacking Iraq, the Bush administration had marginalized UN, induced divisions in EU, damaged relationships with traditional allies, disturbed the foundations of international order and incited a crisis, which could spill over the borders of Iraq.

Mesić improved Croatian foreign relations with Libya by exchanging visits with the Libyan leader Muammar al-Gaddafi, contrary to the wishes of U.S. and British diplomacy.

The first of Mesić's mandate was not marked with historically crucial events like the Tuđman presidency had been, Croatia's public political orientation shifted away from the HDZ, mostly to the benefit of leftist parties. When the government changed hands in late 2003, problems were expected between the leftist President and a Government with rightist members, but Mesić handled the situation gracefully and there were few notable incidents in this regard. He served his first 5-year term until February 2005. In the 2005 election, Mesić was a candidate supported by eight political parties and won nearly half of the vote, but was denied the absolute majority by a few percent. Mesić faced off with Jadranka Kosor in the run-off election and won. He served his second 5-year term until 2010 when he was superseded by Ivo Josipović.

On 1 March 2006 the Civic Assembly of Podgorica, Montenegro's capital, decided to declare Mesić an honorary citizen. The move was opposed by pro-Serbian parties in Montenegro.

In December 2006, a controversy arose when a video was published showing Mesić during a speech in Australia in the early 1990s, where he said that the Croats "won a victory on April 10th" (when the fascist aligned Independent State of Croatia was formed) "as well as in 1945" (when the communist anti-fascists prevailed and the Socialist Republic of Croatia was formed), as well as that Croatia needed to apologize to no one for the Jasenovac concentration camp. Another 1990s-era speech by Mesić sparked controversy on the issue, where he claimed that not all Croats fighting for the Independent State of Croatia were Ustashe supporters and claimed that most were fighting legitimately for Croatian independence. However, in the 2000s Mesić clearly described the persecutions of Serbs in Independent State of Croatia as genocide. In 2017, another recording from 1992 was published, with Mesić talking how Jasenovac wasn't a "death camp", denying the nature of the concentration camp, and other statements considered supportive of the Ustaše. The same year, Mesić apologized for "the imprudent statement" and relativization of the crimes in Jasenovac.

On 21 December 2008, President Mesić compared Dodik's policies to those of the late Serbian President Slobodan Milošević at the beginning of the 1990s. "Just as the world failed to recognize Milošević's policy then, it does not recognize Dodik's policy today," he said. Explaining where such a policy could be headed, he added: "If Dodik manages to merge Republika Srpska with Serbia, all Croats concentrated in Herzegovina will want to join Croatia in the same manner, leaving a rump Bosniak country, surrounded by enemies. If this were to occur, that small country would become the refuge of all the world's terrorists."

Mesić has been accused by the Croatian Helsinki Committee of obstructing the investigation of war crimes committed by the Yugoslav Partisans during World War II. The committee also accused Mesić of abusing the commemorations at the Jasenovac concentration camp for political purposes.

In 2009, he publicly proposed that all crucifixes be removed from Croatian state offices, provoking a negative reaction from the Catholic Church in Croatia.

=== Lawsuits ===
In 2006, Mesić told the Croatian press that Croatian-French lawyer Ivan Jurasinović should visit the psychiatric clinic at Vrapče, after Jurasinović filed charges for Marin Tomulić against Marko Nikolić and others for attempted murder. Jurasinović subsequently launched a civil suit against Mesić which found the president guilty of using his position to attempt to discredit and slander him. Mesić was ordered to compensate Jurasinović 70,000 kunas.

In April 2008 Josip Kokić unsuccessfully petitioned the Croatian Constitutional Court to remove the president's legal immunity, so that he could sue him. Ivan Jurasinović launched another appeal to remove the immunity in November 2008. In 2008, former Constitutional Court judge Vice Vukojević launched a case against Mesić, alleging that he embezzled money along with Vladimir Sokolić under the guise of purchasing vehicles for the Croatian Army in 1993. Political scientist and publisher Darko Petričić claimed that Mesić's first campaign in 2000 was funded by the Albanian mafia. In 2009 Mesić filed a lawsuit for defamation but it was decided in Petričić's favor on 29 March 2012.

In 2015, a court in Hämeenlinna, Finland, sentenced two executives of Finnish company Patria – executive vice president for Croatia Heiki Hulkonen and representative for Croatia Reiji Niittynen – for bribing Croatian officials in making a €112 million contract with Croatian company Đuro Đaković. Each received a suspended sentence of eight years, eight months in prison and a €300,000 fine. Director of sales, Tuomas Korpi, was acquitted. According to the charge, Patria's managers gained €1.6 million through Hans Wolfgang Riedl and Walter Wolf as mediators, and used this money to bribe Croatia's president Mesić and director of the Đuro Đaković company Bartol Jerković.

=== Political activities after the end of the presidential mandate ===
Former Croatian President Mesić, together with former President of Montenegro Vujanovic, former President of Slovenia Turk, former President of Albania Moisiu, former President of Serbia Micic and other politicians from the region, founded the "Podgorica Club" in Podgorica, Montenegro at the beginning of 2019. The Podgorica club is a political initiative of former presidents and prime ministers from the region.

Former President Mesić also participated, together with former presidents and prime ministers from Albania, Kosovo, Macedonia and Bosnia and Herzegovina, at the Inaugural Conference of the International Association of Parliamentarians for Peace in September 2017 in Pristina, Kosovo.

== Awards ==
=== International ===
Award or decoration	Country	Date
Grand Cross with Chain of the Order of the Star of Romania	Romania	June 2000
Grand Star of the Decoration of Honour for Services to the Republic of Austria	Austria	2001
Knight Grand Cross with Grand Cordon of the Order of Merit of the Italian Republic	Italy	5 October 2001
Grand Cross of 1st class of the Order of the White Double Cross	Slovakia	2001
Honorary Knight Grand Cross of the Order of St. Michael and St. George	United Kingdom	December 2001
Grand Cross of 1st class of the Order of Friendship	Kazakhstan	15 April 2002
Grand Cross with Chain of the Order of Merit of the Republic of Hungary	Hungary	2002
Honorary Recipient of the Order of the Crown of the Realm	Malaysia	2002
Honorary Companion of Honour of the National Order of Merit	Malta	26 October 2006
First Class of the Order of Prince Yaroslav the Wise	Ukraine	24 May 2007
Jubilee Medal "60 Years of Victory in the Great Patriotic War 1941–1945"	Russia	9 May 2005
Medal of Pushkin	Russia	31 October 2007
Commander Grand Cross with Chain of the Order of the Three Stars	Latvia	2008
Order of the Republic	Moldova	23 December 2008
Grand Cross of the Order of Saint-Charles	Monaco	16 April 2009
Grand Cross with Collar of the Order of the White Rose of Finland	Finland	2011
National Flag Order	Albania	2018
Knight Grand Cross of the Order of the Knights of Rizal	Philippines	17 February 2024

=== Croatian ===
Award or decoration	Country	Date
Grand Order of King Tomislav	Croatia	11 July 2005

== Honours ==
Honor	Country	Date
Honorary Citizen of Podgorica	Montenegro	2007
Honorary Citizen of Trogir	Croatia	2009
Honorary Citizen of Istria	Croatia	2009
Honorary Citizen of Bihać	Bosnia and Herzegovina	2009
Honorary Citizen of Pristina	Kosovo	2009
Honorary Citizen of Opatija	Croatia	2010
Honorary Citizen of Tetovo	Macedonia	2012
Honorary Citizen of Shengjin	Albania	2013
Honorary Citizen of Tirana	Albania	2013

== See also ==
- Cabinet of Stjepan Mesić

Political offices
Preceded by Antun Milanović	Prime Minister of Croatia; 1990	Succeeded by Josip Manolić
Preceded by Sejdo Bajramović as acting president	President of the Presidency of Yugoslavia; 1991	Succeeded by Branko Kostić as acting president
Preceded by Žarko Domljan	Speaker of the Croatian Parliament; 1992–1994	Succeeded by Nedjeljko Mihanović
Preceded by Zlatko Tomčić as acting president	President of Croatia; 2000–2010	Succeeded by Ivo Josipović
Diplomatic posts
Preceded by Sejdo Bajramović	Secretary General of Non-Aligned Movement; 1991	Succeeded by Branko Kostić
