= Rakovec, Zagreb County =

Rakovec
- Municipality
- Municipality of Rakovec
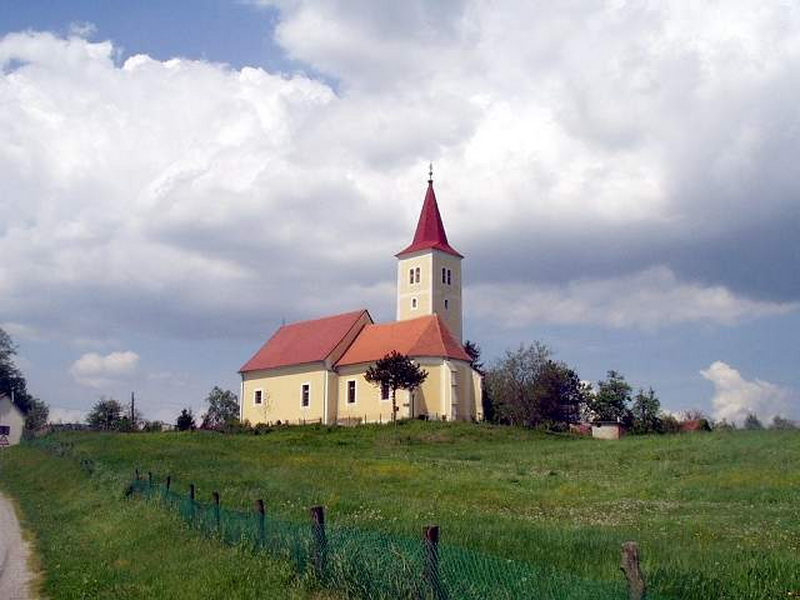
- Interactive map of Rakovec
- Location of Rakovec in Croatia
- Coordinates: 45°55′49.08″N 16°19′21.00″E
- Country: Croatia
- County: Zagreb County

Area
  - Municipality: 34.9 km^{2} (13.5 sq mi)
  - Urban: 5.1 km^{2} (2.0 sq mi)

Population (2021)
  - Municipality: 1,141
  - Density: 32.7/km^{2} (84.7/sq mi)
  - Urban: 226
  - Urban density: 44/km^{2} (110/sq mi)
- Time zone: UTC+1 (Central European Time)
- Vehicle registration: ZG
- Website: rakovec.hr

Rakovec is a village and a municipality in Croatia in the Zagreb County.

In the 2011 census, there were 1,252 inhabitants in the municipality, 98% of which are Croats.

Settlements are:

- Baničevec, population 197
- Brezani, population 136
- Dropčevec, population 84
- Dvorišće, population 164
- Goli Vrh, population 47
- Hruškovec, population 80
- Hudovo, population 90
- Kolenica, population 16
- Lipnica, population 61
- Mlaka, population 99
- Rakovec, population 236
- Valetić, population 42
