= Dragan Kovačević =

Dragan Kovačević may refer to:

- Dragan Kovačević (basketball), Yugoslavia national basketball team player from Serbia
- Dragan Kovačević (politician born 1969), SDP of Croatia & Croatian People's Party; Elections in the Social Democratic Party of Croatia
- Dragan Kovačević (politician born 1968), Croatian Democratic Union member of parliament, see Members of the 6th Sabor
- Dragan Kovačević (football coach), for C.D. Águila

== See also ==
- Dragana Kovačević, a Serbian cyclist
