= Žarko Domljan =

Croatian politician (1932–2020)

Speaker of the Croatian Parliament
- In office 30 May 1990 – 7 September 1992
- Preceded by: Anđelko Runjić
- Succeeded by: Stjepan Mesić

Personal details
- Born: 14 September 1932 Imotski, Kingdom of Yugoslavia (modern Croatia)
- Died: 5 September 2020 (aged 87) Zagreb, Croatia
- Party: HDZ
- Spouse: Iva Marijanović
- Children: 1
- Education: University of Zagreb
- Profession: Philology
- Awards: Order of Danica Hrvatska

Žarko Domljan (14 September 1932 – 5 September 2020) was a Croatian politician who served as the first Speaker of the Croatian Parliament following Croatia's independence from Yugoslavia and as the 11th speaker overall. He served in this position from 30 May 1990 to 2 August 1992. Domljan was later a representative in the Parliamentary Assembly of the Council of Europe.

He died on 5 September 2020 at the age of 87.
