= Branko Hrg =

Croatian politician (born 1961)

Mayor of Križevci
- In office 20 June 2001 – 09 June 2017
- Deputy: Dragutin Guzalić Stjepan Peršin
- Preceded by: Roko Bašić
- Succeeded by: Mario Rajn

President of the Croatian Peasant Party
- In office 28 January 2012 – 19 March 2016
- Vice President: Krešo Beljak Marijana Petir Darko Rukavina Marina Kolaković Vlasta Hubicki
- Preceded by: Josip Friščić
- Succeeded by: Krešo Beljak

Personal details
- Born: 26 September 1961 (age 65) Kalnički Potok near Križevci, PR Croatia, FPR Yugoslavia (modern Croatia)
- Party: Croatian Peasant Party (1992–2016); Independent (2016–)
- Occupation: Politician
- Profession: Pedagogue
- Website: Official website

Branko Hrg (born 26 September 1961) is a Croatian politician and former leader of the Croatian Peasant Party (HSS). He was a member of HSS from 1992 to 2016 and served as a mayor of Križevci from 2001 to 2017.

In January 2012 intra-party elections, Hrg beat former Croatian Minister of Tourism Damir Bajs with 555 votes over 374.

On March 19 2016 he lost, with 188 votes, in the first round of intra-party elections, against Krešo Beljak who got 339 votes and Nenad Matić who got 225 votes, making him no longer the President of HSS, or politically relevant.

Party political offices
Preceded by Josip Friščić	President of Croatian Peasant Party; January 2012 – March 2016	Succeeded by Krešo Beljak
