= Croatian Independent Democrats =

Defunct political party in Croatia

Croatian Independent Democrats (Croatian: Hrvatski nezavisni demokrati or HND) was a political party in Croatia.

== History ==
Its founders were members of the moderate faction within the Croatian Democratic Union. In 1993, their unofficial leader Josip Manolić, former protégé of President Franjo Tuđman, had been demoted and was becoming increasingly marginalized, while Gojko Šušak, the powerful defense minister and leader of the hardline nationalist faction, was winning Tuđman's favour. Following the rift between the two, Tuđman, in the Spring of 1994, tried to replace Manolić from the position of speaker. Manolić, however, preempted this by convincing a number of HDZ representatives, along with the opposition parties, to support him . Soon, he was joined by the speaker Stjepan Mesić and two of them announced a split from HDZ and the formation of a new party. They accused Tuđman of embracing authoritarianism, extreme nationalism and irredentist policies towards Bosnia and Herzegovina, which was, in their mind, a betrayal of the founding principles of HDZ. From that point onward, HND tried to describe itself as the "genuine" HDZ.

For a while, it looked that HDZ would ultimately lose parliamentary majority, but Tuđman, in the end, managed to keep number of the moderates in line, thus maintaining and later solidifying his grip on power. HND nevertheless managed to replace HDZ governments on local levels, most notably in Zagreb County, an event that would eventually lead to the Zagreb Crisis.

In the 1995 parliamentary elections, the HND received 3.0% of the vote. It became apparent that HND did not attract many HDZ voters, while those already opposed to Tuđman overwhelmingly preferred the established opposition parties. As a result, HND failed to enter the Sabor. This led Mesić to leave the party and join the Croatian People's Party, while Manolić began to try mending ties with HDZ. As a result, HND became marginalized and ceased to exist.
