= Vlatko Pavletić =

Croatian politician (1930–2007)

Acting President of Croatia
- In office 10 December 1999 – 2 February 2000
- Prime Minister: Zlatko Mateša; Ivica Račan
- Preceded by: Franjo Tuđman
- Succeeded by: Zlatko Tomčić (acting)

Speaker of the Croatian Parliament
- In office 28 October 1995 – 2 February 2000
- Preceded by: Nedjeljko Mihanović
- Succeeded by: Zlatko Tomčić

Minister of Education
- In office 30 May 1990 – 15 April 1992
- Prime Minister: Stjepan Mesić; Josip Manolić; Franjo Gregurić
- Preceded by: Office established
- Succeeded by: Vesna Girardi-Jurkić

Personal details
- Born: 2 December 1930 Zagreb, Kingdom of Yugoslavia (modern Croatia)
- Died: 19 September 2007 (aged 76) Zagreb, Croatia
- Party: Croatian Democratic Union
- Education: University of Zagreb
- Occupation: Politician, university professor, literary critic, essayist

Vlatko Pavletić (pronounced [ʋlâtko pǎʋletit͡ɕ]; 2 December 1930 – 19 September 2007) was a Croatian politician, university professor, literary critic and essayist who served as acting President of Croatia from 1999 to 2000, as well as he served as Speaker of the Croatian Parliament from 1995 to 2000.

Pavletić was born in Zagreb, then in the Kingdom of Yugoslavia. In 1955, he graduated from the Faculty of Philosophy at the University of Zagreb, where he majored in Croatian language and literature. In 1972, he was imprisoned for a year and a half by the communist Yugoslav government as a Croatian nationalist for "attempting to destroy and change the state organization". He earned a doctorate in 1975.

Between 1990 and 1992, Pavletić served as Minister of Education under prime ministers Stjepan Mesić, Josip Manolić and Franjo Gregurić. In 1992, he was elected to the Croatian Parliament and was appointed Speaker of the Parliament on 28 November 1995. He held the post until 2000.

When President Franjo Tuđman was declared incapacitated on 26 November 1999, he automatically became acting President of Croatia. He held this office from Tuđman's death on 10 December 1999 until the Croatian Parliament elected Zlatko Tomčić as new speaker (and thus the new acting president) on 2 February 2000.

In 2004, Pavletić retired from politics. He died in Zagreb from pancreatic cancer on 19 September 2007. He was 76.

Political offices
New title	Minister of Education, Culture and Sports; 1990–1992	Succeeded by Vesna Girardi-Jurkić
Preceded by Nedjeljko Mihanović	Speaker of the Croatian Parliament; 1995–2000	Succeeded by Zlatko Tomčić; Acting
Preceded by Franjo Tuđman as president	Acting President of Croatia; 1999–2000	Succeeded by Zlatko Tomčić; Acting
Academic offices
Preceded by Enes Midžić	Dean of the Academy of Dramatic Art; 1992	Succeeded by Enes Midžić
