= Marija Lugarić =

Croatian politician (born 1978)

Marija Lugarić (born 1 June 1978 in Zagreb) is a Croatian centre-left politician representing the Social Democratic Party of Croatia (SDP), currently the biggest opposition party in Croatia. She was first elected to the Croatian parliament in the 2000 election, and currently specialises in criticising education policy legislation.
