= Baltazar Jalšovec =

Croatian politician

Deputy Speaker of the Croatian Parliament
- In office 2 February 2000 – 22 December 2003

Member of the Croatian Parliament
- In office 30 May 1990 – 22 December 2003

Member of the Sabor of the Socialist Republic of Croatia
- In office 1986–1990

Personal details
- Born: 3 January 1947 Štrukovec, FPR Yugoslavia
- Died: 16 November 2025 (aged 78)
- Party: Croatian Social Liberal Party (1989-2002); Party of Liberal Democrats (2002-2003)
- Education: Industrial Construction School, Ljubljana

Baltazar Jalšovec (3 January 1947 – 16 November 2025) was a Croatian politician who served as a member of the Croatian Parliament from 1990 until 2003, and as a deputy speaker from 2000 until 2003.

== Early life and education ==
Jalšovec was born on 3 January 1947 in Štrukovec in Međimurje. He attended and graduated from the Industrial Construction School in Ljubljana. After graduation, he worked as a farmer. In 1971, he moved abroad, continuing to affiliate with various Croatian organizations before returning to Croatia.

== Career ==
Jalšovec served as a municipal officer in Čakovec at the beginning of his political career. In 1986, he joined the parliament of Socialist Republic of Croatia. In 1989, he helped found the Croatian Social Liberal Party (HSLS), running with the party during the first parliamentary election in 1990. He subsequently was elected MP in the 1992, 1995, and 2000 parliamentary election. Following the 2000 election, he was elected deputy speaker of parliament. During his parliamentary career, he advocated for better conditions for the agriculture industry, the promotion of more democratic ideals, and the preservation of the standard Croatian language. On 25 January 2002, he was elected a member of the Committee of Petitions and Appeals. Later in 2002, he helped found the Party of Liberal Democrats (LIBRA) after a party split from other members of the HSLS.

Jalšovec's mandate ended on 22 December 2003, where he retired from politics.

== Death ==
Jalšovec died on 16 November 2025.
