= Croatian Peasant Party =

Political party in Croatia

Croatian Peasant Party Hrvatska seljačka stranka
- Abbreviation: HSS
- President: Darko Vuletić
- Founders: Antun Radić; Stjepan Radić
- Founded: 22 December 1904 (historical party); 15 December 1989 (modern party)
- Headquarters: Ulica kralja Zvonimira, Zagreb
- Paramilitary wing: Croatian Peasant Defence (1936–1941)
- Membership (2024): 10,260
- Ideology: Agrarianism; Republicanism; Pro-Europeanism; Christian democracy
- Political position: Centre
- National affiliation: Patriotic Coalition (2015–2016); SDP-led coalitions (2016–2026)
- European affiliation: European People's Party (until 2019)
- International affiliation: Green International (1921–1988); Peasant International (1924–1925)
- Colours: Green
- Slogan: Faith in God and Peasant Unity
- Anthem: "Slavni sine hrvatskoga roda" lit. 'Glorious Son of the Croatian People'
- Sabor: 1 / 151
- European Parliament: 0 / 12
- County Prefects: 0 / 21
- Mayors: 2 / 128

Party flag

Website
- hss.hr

The Croatian Peasant Party (Croatian: Hrvatska seljačka stranka, HSS) is an agrarian political party in Croatia founded on 22 December 1904 by Antun and Stjepan Radić as Croatian Peoples' Peasant Party (HPSS). The Brothers Radić believed that the realization of Croatian statehood was possible within Austria-Hungary, but that it had to be reformed as a monarchy divided into three equal parts – Austria, Hungary, and Croatia. After the creation of Kingdom of Yugoslavia in 1918, the party requested self-determination for the Croatian part of the kingdom. This brought them great public support, which culminated in HPSS winning 50 seats, a majority assigned to Croatia in the 1920 parliamentary election.

In 1920, disgruntled with the position of Croats in the kingdom, the party changed its name into Croatian Republican Peasant Party (HRSS) and started advocating secession from the kingdom and the establishment of a "peaceful peasant Republic of Croatia". In the 1923 and 1925 elections, HRSS doubled the number of votes they received, making them the second largest party in the Parliament of Yugoslavia.

In 1925, faced with constant prosecution by the regime, HRSS was forced to soften its policy and change its name into the Croatian Peasant Party (HSS), recognize the Vidovdan Constitution, and form a coalition with the Serbian People's Radical Party. This resulted in HSS losing its popularity and one-third of its vote share in the 1927 election. After the termination of the coalition agreement with the Radicals, HSS formed the Peasant-Democratic Coalition with Pribičević's Independent Democratic Party. After the assassination of Stjepan Radić in 1928, Vladko Maček became the new president of HSS.

After King Alexander declared a dictatorship in 1929, HSS was banned and its members prosecuted. HSS participated in the 1935 and 1938 elections as a part of the United Opposition coalition, which helped it to regain its influence. In 1939, the Cvetković–Maček Agreement established the HSS-governed Banovina of Croatia. After the establishment of the Independent State of Croatia (NDH), a Nazi-puppet state, in 1941, HSS was banned once again, with half of its members joining either the Ustaše or the Partisans. A part stayed loyal to Maček, who believed that the victory of Allies would bring liberal democracy into Croatia and that HSS would return to power. In May 1945, Maček left the country, while HSS split into two fractions which boycotted the 1945 election because of their opposition to the Communists. Under the Socialist Federal Republic of Yugoslavia (1945–1991), HSS was active abroad.

During the breakup of Yugoslavia, HSS was restored under the leadership of Drago Stipac on 25 May 1991. The party first entered government after the 2000 Croatian elections as part of a liberal coalition (HSS-IDS-HNS-LS-SDA), with Ivica Račan (SDP) serving as Prime Minister and HSS president Zlatko Tomčić as Speaker of the Parliament. HSS lost the 2003 election and joined the opposition. In 2007, HSS formed yet another liberal coalition (HSLS-PGS-ZDS-ZS) and led the Ministries of Tourism and Agriculture in the Cabinet of Ivo Sanader II, and Ministries of Tourism and Regional Development in the Cabinet of Jadranka Kosor. In 2011, the party won only one seat in Parliament and moved to the opposition. In 2015, HSS won one seat as part of the conservative Patriotic Coalition and supported Tihomir Orešković as prime minister. In 2016, HSS won 5 seats as part of the liberal People's Coalition.

== History ==
=== Radić presidency ===
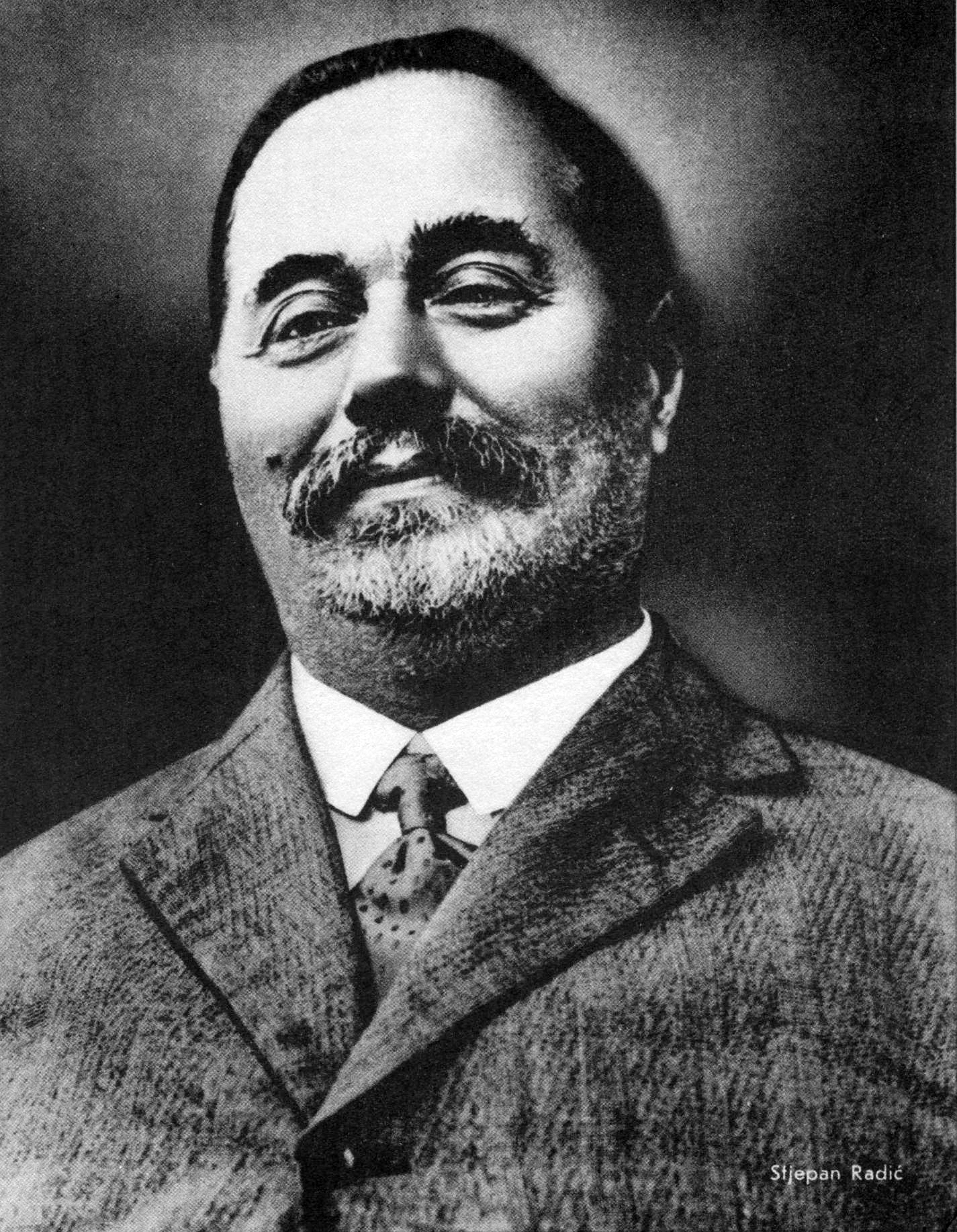
Stjepan Radić

The Croatian People's Peasant Party (Hrvatska pučka seljačka stranka, HPSS) was established in 1904 by brothers Stjepan Radić and Antun Radić in the Kingdom of Croatia-Slavonia – itself a part of the Hungarian part of the dualist Austria-Hungary at the time. The founding of the HPSS was a part of the process of fragmentation of the United Croat Opposition. The party pursued the establishment of a comprehensive grassroots network, national unity and agrarianism, as the Radić's distrusted traditional political parties. Even though the HPSS achieved only minor significance before the end of World War I, the party gradually became a mass movement after 1918. This gave it the central role in the completion of Croatian national integration. The HPSS platform of antimilitarism and pacifism became very popular in the final year of the war, especially in Croatia-Slavonia, which was affected by widespread unrest associated with the Green Cadres. Furthermore, the restricted voting rights were expanded after 1918 by the introduction of universal manhood suffrage, allowing the proportionally large peasant population (80% of Croatia-Slavonia at the time) to predominantly vote for the HPSS. Antun Radić died in 1919, leaving Stjepan as the sole leader of the HPSS.

After the war, following the 1920 Croatian Peasant Rebellion, the HPSS became the only significant political party in Croatia, and the second largest party in the newly established Kingdom of Serbs, Croats and Slovenes (later renamed Yugoslavia). In 1920s, the HPSS policy was based on republicanism, opposition to further unification of the new state, demands for a neutral Croat peasant republic, and the advocation of national self-determination. To reinforce the republican message, the HPSS was formally renamed the Croatian Republican Peasant Party in 1920. Shortly following its accession to the Peasant International, the regime initiated a campaign to suppress the party activities in the run up to the 1925 Yugoslav parliamentary election using political, police, military and paramilitary pressure, and arresting its leaders. Even though the party achieved the second-largest share of seats, the government retained its parliamentary majority. Nonetheless, shortly after the election, there were negotiations between Radić and King Alexander's envoys. The talks ended in Radić renouncing republicanism and accepting the monarchy in return for his release and participation in a coalition government led by the People's Radical Party (NRS). The party was renamed the Croatian Peasant Party (HSS). Radić later admitted that he accepted the monarchy to protect his people.

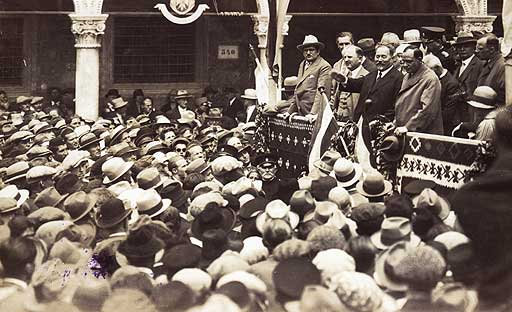
Stjepan Radić at the assembly in Dubrovnik

The HSS had little real influence in the coalition government which lasted until 1927. At the same time, the Radić's participation in the coalition was criticised in Croatia and in the HSS – although not sufficiently to threaten his leadership. A part of the membership split in protest, forming the Croatian Federalist Peasant Party. The Communist Party of Yugoslavia (Komunistička partija Jugoslavije, KPJ) also criticised Radić for his cooperation with the regime. The KPJ had recently adopted the federalist approach to reform of the country and saw the republican movement of the HRSS as a potential recruitment pool. The HSS conversely, regardless of KPJ's formal federalist policy, saw the KPJ as unitarists and essentially a political endeavour to promote Serbian agenda.

The HSS left the government in January 1927. Radić resumed pursuit of resolution of the Croatian question by advocating unification of Croatian lands including Slavonia and Dalmatia into a single self-governing unit and stopping Italian immigration by abolishing the 1925 Treaty of Nettuno. In November, the HSS formed the Peasant-Democratic Coalition with the Independent Democratic Party (Samostalna demokratska stranka, SDS), the most popular party among the Serbs of Croatia. Tense relations between the opposition and the government deteriorated further until a shouting match in the parliament escalated to the point where NRS deputy Puniša Račić shot several HSS parliament members killing two and wounding three including Radić on 20 June 1928. Radić suggested that the shootings were a result of a regime plan and that the HSS should abandon pacifism. Soon afterwards, Radić died of the wounds on 8 August. Following the assassinations, the Yugoslav state lost any legitimacy among Croats – who appeared united in demands for overhaul of the state. HSS thus became the only major political party among Croats. Vladko Maček was elected to replace Radić almost immediately after his death.

Year	Popular vote	% of popular vote	Coalition	Seats won	Seat change	Government
November 1920	230,590	14.3%	—	50 / 315	▲50	opposition
March 1923	473,733	21.9%	—	70 / 315	▲20	opposition
February 1925	545,466	22.2%	—	67 / 315	▼3	government
September 1927	367,570	15.8%	—	61 / 315	▼6	opposition

=== Maček presidency ===
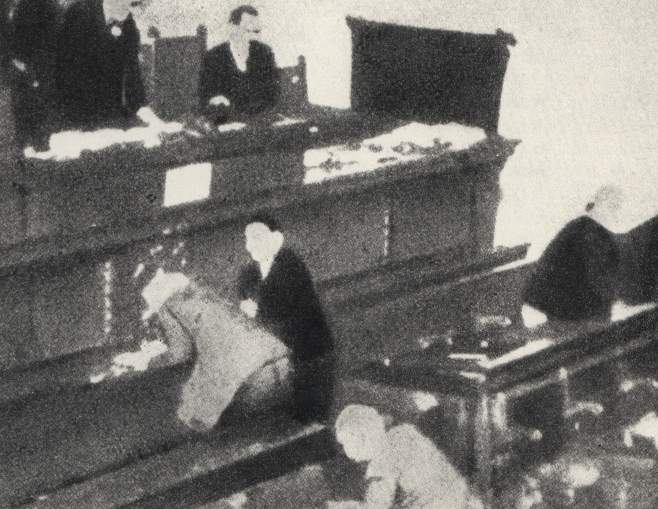
Photograph of the shootings of HSS representatives by Puniša Račić

Under Maček, the HSS continued political opposition to the regime. The United Opposition which included the HSS, stood in 1935 and 1938 Yugoslavian parliamentary election. In the latter, the United Opposition won the majority of votes, but due to operation of the election law, it received 67 out of 373 seats in the parliament.

Prompted by the failure of the government to secure the rule of law and public order, the HSS established the Croatian Peasant Defence (HSZ) as a party paramilitary force in 1936. The force was established to protect Croats against paramilitaries supported or tolerated by the regime. The force was also designed as a response to Ustaše challenge for dominance among Croats as a force capable of providing physical protection following the Velebit uprising. It was meant to demonstrate that the HSS is not a pacifist organisation resigned to passivity. In cities, the HSZ operated under the name of Croatian Civil Defence.

In 1936 and 1937, Maček unsuccessfully negotiated with Regent Prince Paul Prime Minister Milan Stojadinović with the aim of consolidation of Croatian lands within Yugoslavia – with a degree of autonomy. Then, after contacting several European governments and failing to get their support, he turned to Italian foreign minister Galeazzo Ciano in 1938. Through an intermediary, Maček explained the HSS wanted Croatia united as a federal unit of Yugoslavia encompassing territories of former Croatia–Slavonia to a line between Ilok and Sremska Mitrovica, and Dalmatia without the Bay of Kotor with the addition of Bosnia and Herzegovina west of Vrbas and Neretva Rivers. At the time, Italy was harbouring and supporting Croatian nationalist group Ustaše, but Ciano preferred to work with Maček because the HSS enjoyed far greater support among Croats and because Ciano believed that would discourage contacts between the HSS and Nazi Germany – denying German access to the Adriatic Sea. Ciano wrote back to Maček urging him to demand more territory and elaborate on his ideas.

In 1939, Stojadinović was replaced by Dragiša Cvetković and Maček contacted him with the same request. The two reached a preliminary agreement, but Prince Paul vetoed the idea objecting to partition of Bosnia and Herzegovina. Maček then wrote back to Ciano explaining that he seeks status of a federal unit for Croatia within Yugoslavia, with joint foreign affairs, defence, central bank, state monopolies, and customs. He modified the territorial demands by moving the Vrbas line to the Bosna River. In return, the Italian Foreign Ministry drafted a document offering Maček a loan to finance an uprising which the HSS would launch and then invite Italian military intervention. The plan also envisaged establishment of a Croatian state under Italian protection. Maček wrote back declining the offer and saying that was not what he asked for and that he had struck a deal with Cvetković government in the meantime.

The Cvetković–Maček Agreement was concluded on 26 August 1939 establishing autonomous Banovina of Croatia. Maček became the deputy prime minister of Yugoslavia and several members of the Peasant–Democratic Coalition were added to the cabinet. The agreement angered Ustaše who launched a propaganda campaign against Maček and the HSS as traitors of Croatian interests while Italy switched its support back to Ustaše.

Year	Popular vote	% of popular vote	Coalition	Seats won	Seat change	Government
November 1931	banned		—	0 / 370	▼61	no seats
May 1935	1,076,345	37.4%	United Opposition	67 / 370	▲67	opposition
December 1938	1,364,524	44.9%	United Opposition	67 / 373	Steady	government

=== World War II and afterwards ===
The party's fortunes declined precipitously with the outbreak of World War II and the Axis invasion in April 1941. Some party members were divided among those who sympathized with the Croatian fascist Ustasha independence movement, and those whose left-leaning beliefs led them to join the Partisans. But the vast majority of HSS supporters remained passive and neutral for the duration of the war as the Ustasha, the communist Partisans and the royalist Chetniks fought for control.

After the communist victory, the KPJ established one-party rule — the HSS, along with other political parties were declared illegal. In 1947, HSS joined the International Peasants' Union. Maček represented the HSS in exile until his death in 1964. Juraj Krnjević took over as leader until his own death 1988, only a year before the HSS could resume its work within Croatia.

=== Modern party ===
Initial logo of the party

With the advent of multi-party system in 1990, the HSS was reconstituted by Ivan Zvonimir Čičak and in the 1990 election won several seats in the Croatian Parliament. They remained in opposition until the 2000 elections when they received three ministerial portfolios as part of their participation in the winning Social Democratic Party of Croatia-led coalition.

On elections 2000 HSS led center coalition alongside IDS-HNS-LS and Coalition won 25 seats in parliament with 17 seats for HSS (16 domestic and one minority seat). After the elections HSS formed coalition with SDP and had three ministers in government (education, agriculture and entrepreneurship), vice president of government and Speaker of Croatian Parliament, Zlatko Tomčić.

On local elections 2001. HSS achieved its best results ever and won 8 out of 21 county prefects (župan) and lot of municipalities and towns and became party which was second in number of local elected officials.

Today, the HSS considers itself among other center European political parties that advocate pro-agrarian policies and greater economic interventionism by the state. On social matters the HSS is largely conservative, supporting a Christian-based morality in public life. HSS is an associate member of the European People's Party (EPP).

At the elections in November 2003, the party won 7.2% of the popular vote and 10 out of 151 seats (nine domestic seats and one minority seat).

Before the 2007 parliamentary elections, HSS announced a coalition with opposition parties Alliance of Primorje-Gorski Kotar and Croatian Social Liberal Party. The coalition received 6.5% of the popular vote and 8 out of 153 seats (six for HSS itself). After elections they became part of Ivo Sanader's governing coalition and received two ministerial portfolios (regional development and tourism), vice-president of government and vicepresident of Parliament.

On 2011 parliamentary elections party score worst result in party's history receiving only one parliamentary seat and 3% of popular vote.

Party convention 28 January 2012 elected Branko Hrg as new president.

In 2014 Croatian Peasant Party in coalition with Croatian Democratic Union won one seat in European Parliament – Marijana Petir. However, on 6 June 2017 Petir was expelled from Croatian Peasant Party, which left the party without seats in European Parliament.

== Election results ==
=== Parliamentary ===
The following is a summary of HSS's results in parliamentary elections for the Croatian parliament. The "Total votes" and "Percentage" columns include sums of votes won by pre-election coalitions HSS had been part of. After preferential votes were introduced into the electoral system, the total votes column includes the statistic of the sum of votes given to HSS candidates on the coalition lists. The "Total seats" column includes sums of seats won by HSS in election constituencies plus representatives of ethnic minorities affiliated with HSS.

Election	In coalition with	Votes won	Percentage	Seats won	Change	Government
Election	In coalition with	(Coalition totals)		(HSS only)		Government
1992	None	111,869	4.25	3 / 138	New	Opposition
1995	HNS-IDS–HKDU–SBHS	441,390	18.26	10 / 127	▲7	Opposition
2000	HNS–IDS–LS–ASH	432,527	14.70	17 / 151	▲7	Government
2003	None	177,359	7.20	10 / 151	▼7	Opposition
2007	HSLS-PGS	161,814	6.50	6 / 153	▼4	Government
2011	None	71,450	3.00	1 / 151	▼5	Opposition
2015	Patriotic Coalition	744,507 (23,423)	33.46	1 / 151	0	Government support
2016	People's Coalition	636,602 (33,514)	33.82	5 / 151	▲4	Opposition
2020	Restart Coalition	414,615	24.87	2 / 151	▼3	Opposition
2024	Rivers of Justice	538,748	25.40	1 / 151	▼1	Opposition

=== Presidential ===
The following is a list of presidential candidates who were endorsed by HSS.

Election year(s)	Candidate	1st round		2nd round		Result
Election year(s)	Candidate	Votes	%	Votes	%	Result
2000	Stjepan Mesić (HNS)	1.100.671	41.3 (#1)	1.433.372	56.01 (#1)	Won
2005	Stjepan Mesić (Ind.)	1.089.398	48.92 (#1)	1.454.451	65.93 (#1)	Won
2009–10	None					
2014–15	Kolinda Grabar-Kitarović (HDZ)	665.379	37.22 (#2)	1.114.945	50.74 (#1)	Won
2019–20	Zoran Milanović (SDP)	562,783	29.55 (#1)	1,034,170	52.66 (#1)	Won
2024–25	Zoran Milanović (Ind.)	797,938	49.68 (#1)	1,122,859	74.68 (#1)	Won

=== European Parliament ===
Election	List leader	Coalition	Votes	%	Seats	+/–	EP Group
Election	List leader	Coalition	Coalition		HSS		EP Group
2013	Miroslav Rožić	HSLS	28,646	3.86 (#4)	0 / 12	New	–
2014	Andrej Plenković	HDZ–HSP-AS–BUZ–ZDS–HDS	381,844	41.42 (#1)	1 / 11	▲1	EPP
2019	Valter Flego	Amsterdam Coalition	55,806	5.19 (#5)	0 / 12	▼1	–
2024	Biljana Borzan	Rivers of Justice	192,859	25.62 (#2)	0 / 12	0	–

== Party presidents ==
- Stjepan Radić (1904–1928)
- Vladko Maček (1928–1964)
- Juraj Krnjević (1964–1988)
- Josip Torbar (1988–1991)
- Drago Stipac (1991–1994)
- Zlatko Tomčić (1994–2005)
- Josip Friščić (2005–2012)
- Branko Hrg (2012–2016)
- Hrvoje Duvnjak (2016–2020)
- Krešo Beljak (2020–2025)
- Darko Vuletić (2025–present)

== See also ==
- Croatian Peasant Party of Bosnia and Herzegovina
- Slovene Peasant Party

== Sources ==
- Biondich, Mark (2000). Stjepan Radić, the Croat Peasant Party, and the Politics of Mass Mobilization, 1904-1928. Toronto, Canada: University of Toronto Press. ISBN 0-8020-4727-0.
- Newman, John Paul (2015). Yugoslavia in the Shadow of War: Veterans and the Limits of State Building, 1903–1945. Cambridge: Cambridge University Press. ISBN 9781107070769.
- Ramet, Sabrina P. (2007). "Vladko Maček and the Croatian Peasant Defence in the Kingdom of Yugoslavia". Contemporary European History. 16 (2). Cambridge, UK: Cambridge University Press: 215–231. doi:10.1017/S0960777307003803. ISSN 0960-7773. JSTOR 20081354. S2CID 162808232.
- Tomasevich, Jozo (2001). War and Revolution in Yugoslavia, 1941–1945: Occupation and Collaboration. Stanford, California: Stanford University Press. ISBN 978-0-8047-0857-9.
