= Politics of the Socialist Republic of Croatia =

The Socialist Republic of Croatia was one of the six constituent republics of the Socialist Federal Republic of Yugoslavia in its political life, during which its major political characteristics changed - its name, its top level leadership and ultimately its political organization.

During this period, the principal political offices included the head of government and the leadership of the League of Communists of Croatia, while the functions of head of state changed over time and, after 1974, were exercised by a collective Presidency, the Croatian Communist Party, a branch of the Communist Party of Yugoslavia, both of which had also changed names during this period.

The heads of government were generally titled President of the Executive Council of the Sabor (President of the Executive Council), and they were drawn from the Communist Party/League of Communists, which was reformed and renamed into the League of Communists in 1952, both at the federal and at the republic level.

The heads of the communist party held the title of the Secretary of the League of Communists of Croatia, later President thereof, and together with the President of the Executive Council, this remained the central post of Croatian politics at the time, in spite of the institution of a collective Presidency in 1974. The mostly-nominal function of the head of state had at times belonged to the Speaker of the Croatian Parliament, the Sabor.

== Executive ==
=== Heads of state of the Socialist Republic of Croatia ===
Parties: NFJ HSS KPH / SKH HDZ

No.	Picture	Name (birth–death)	Term of office		Party
Chairman of ZAVNOH; 1943–1944
1		Vladimir Nazor (1876–1949)	13 Jun 1943	9 May 1944	NFJ
President of the Presidency of ZAVNOH; 1944–1945
(1)		Vladimir Nazor (1876–1949)	9 May 1944	24 Jul 1945	NFJ
President of the Presidency of the People's Assembly of Croatia; 1945–1946
(1)		Vladimir Nazor (1876–1949)	24 Jul 1945	28 Feb 1946	NFJ
President of the Presidency of the People's Assembly of the People's Republic of Croatia; 1946
(1)		Vladimir Nazor (1876–1949)	28 Feb 1946	30 Nov 1946	NFJ
President of the Presidency of the Constitutional Assembly of the People's Republic of Croatia; 1946–1947
(1)		Vladimir Nazor (1876–1949)	30 Nov 1946	18 Jan 1947	NFJ
President of the Presidency of the People's Assembly of the People's Republic of Croatia; 1947–1953
(1)		Vladimir Nazor (1876–1949)	18 Jan 1947	19 Jun 1949	NFJ
–		Antun Babić (Vice-President) (1899–1989)	19 Jun 1949	15 Oct 1949	HSS
–		Mile Počuča (Vice-President) (1899–1979)	19 Jun 1949	15 Oct 1949	KPH
2		Karlo Mrazović (1902–1987)	15 Oct 1949	18 Mar 1952	KPH
3		Vicko Krstulović (1905–1988)	18 Mar 1952	6 Feb 1953	KPH/SKH
President of the People's Assembly of the People's Republic of Croatia; 1953–1963
4		Zlatan Sremec (1898–1971)	6 Feb 1953	18 Dec 1953	SKH
5		Vladimir Bakarić (1912–1983)	18 Dec 1953	7 Apr 1963	SKH
President of the People's Assembly of the Socialist Republic of Croatia; 1963–1974
(5)		Vladimir Bakarić (1912–1983)	7 Apr 1963	27 June 1963	SKH
6		Ivan Krajačić (1906–1986)	27 Jun 1963	11 May 1967	SKH
7		Jakov Blažević (1912–1996)	11 May 1967	8 May 1974	SKH
President of the Presidency of the Socialist Republic of Croatia; 1974–1990
(7)		Jakov Blažević (1912–1996)	8 May 1974	10 May 1982	SKH
8		Marijan Cvetković (1920–1990)	10 May 1982	11 May 1983	SKH
9		Milutin Baltić (1920–2013)	11 May 1983	10 May 1984	SKH
10		Jakša Petrić (1922–1993)	10 May 1984	10 May 1985	SKH
11		Pero Car (1920–1985)	10 May 1985	15 Nov 1985	SKH
–		Office vacant	15 Nov 1985	26 Dec 1985	
12		Ema Derossi-Bjelajac (1926–2020)	26 Dec 1985	9 May 1986	SKH
13		Ante Marković (1924–2011)	9 May 1986	9 May 1988	SKH
14		Ivo Latin (1929–2002)	9 May 1988	30 May 1990	SKH
Following the 1990 Croatian parliamentary election and constitutional reforms
1		Franjo Tuđman (Note: The title was changed to President of the Presidency of the Republic of Croatia on 25 July 1990, and then to President of Croatia on 22 December 1990 following the adoption of the new Constitution.) (1922–1999)	30 May 1990	8 October 1991	HDZ

=== Heads of government of the Socialist Republic of Croatia ===
Parties: KPH / SKH HDZ

No.	Picture	Name (birth–death)	Term of office		Party
President of the Government; 1945–1953
1		Vladimir Bakarić (1912–1983)	14 Apr 1945	6 Feb 1953	KPH / SKH
President of the Executive Council; 1953–1990
(1)		Vladimir Bakarić (1912–1983)	6 Feb 1953	18 Dec 1953	SKH
2		Jakov Blažević (1912–1996)	18 Dec 1953	10 Jul 1962	SKH
3		Zvonko Brkić (1912–1977)	10 Jul 1962	27 Jun 1963	SKH
4		Mika Špiljak (1916–2007)	27 Jun 1963	11 May 1967	SKH
5		Savka Dabčević-Kučar (1923–2009)	11 May 1967	8 May 1969	SKH
6		Dragutin Haramija (1923–2012)	8 May 1969	28 Dec 1971	SKH
7		Ivo Perišin (1925–2008)	28 Dec 1971	8 May 1974	SKH
8		Jakov Sirotković (1922–2002)	8 May 1974	9 May 1978	SKH
9		Petar Fleković (1932–)	9 May 1978	10 May 1982	SKH
10		Ante Marković (1924–2011)	10 May 1982	10 May 1986	SKH
11		Antun Milović (1934–2008)	10 May 1986	30 May 1990	SKH
Following the 1990 Croatian parliamentary election and constitutional reforms
1		Stjepan Mesić (1934–)	30 May 1990	24 August 1990	HDZ
2		Josip Manolić (Note: Served as Prime Minister on 25 June 1991, when Croatia officially declared its independence from SFR Yugoslavia.) (1920–2024)	24 August 1990	17 July 1991	HDZ
3		Franjo Gregurić (Note: Served as Prime Minister on 8 October 1991, when the three-month moratorium on the declaration expired and the Croatian Parliament formally severed all remaining constitutional and legal ties with SFR Yugoslavia.) (1939–)	17 July 1990	8 October 1991	HDZ

President of the League of Communists of Croatia, was the primary political leadership position in the Socialist Republic of Croatia during the era of one-party rule.

=== Federal State of Croatia (1943–1945) ===
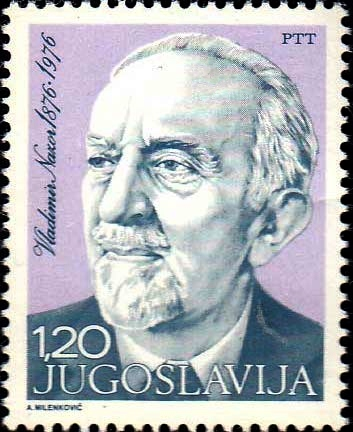
Vladimir Nazor

The initial incarnation of the political organization of Croatia came about during World War II in Yugoslavia. The Independent State of Croatia (NDH), installed by the Axis powers after the invasion of Yugoslavia in 1941 was not recognized by the entirety of the Croatian public, notably the Communist Party of Croatia and parts of the Croatian Peasant Party during World War II, which would engage in the armed resistance against this fascist puppet state. By 1943, they had taken control of a significant portion of Croatian territory and were able to engage in more conventional political organization.

The first top-level political official of the country at the time was the President of the State Anti-Fascist Council for the National Liberation of Croatia. Vladimir Nazor (1876–1949) held this title between 13 June 1943 and 21 August 1945. He was an independent member of the Unitary National Liberation Front, i.e. the National Front. His position was formally the Speaker of the State Anti-fascist Council for the National Liberation of Croatia, as the Council (ZAVNOH) served as the country's war-time assembly.

Andrija Hebrang was the General Secretary of the Communist Party of Croatia between 1942 and October 1944. Vladimir Bakarić was the General Secretary after 1944, and the President of Government since 14 April 1945, a position equated to modern-day prime minister.

=== People's Republic of Croatia (1946–1963) ===
After WWII, Nazor served as head of state as the first President of the Presidency of the Parliament, between 26 February 1946 and 19 June 1949 (he died in office). This position would exist until 1953, and other people who were named the President of the Presidency of the Parliament of the People's Republic of Croatia were:

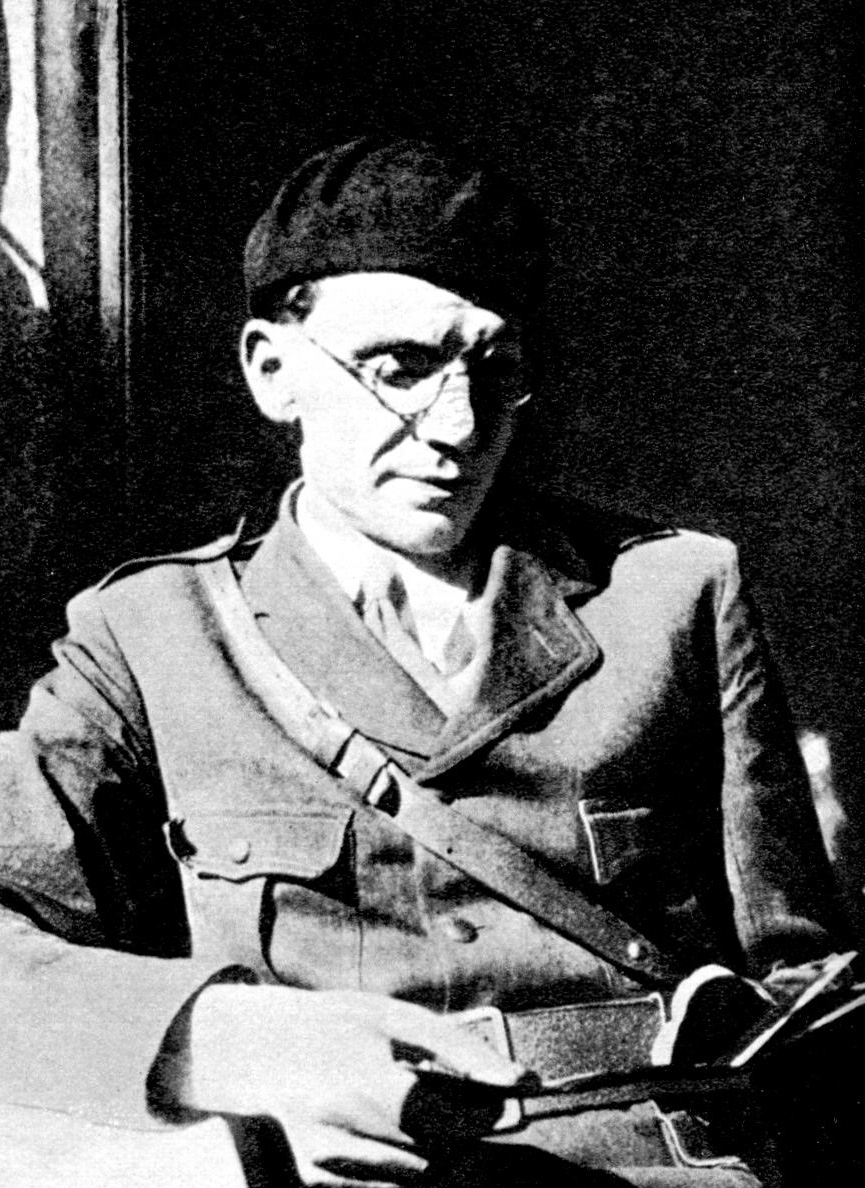
Karlo Mrazović

- Karlo Mrazović (1902–1987), served between 15 October 1949 and 18 March 1952, member of the Communist Party of Yugoslavia

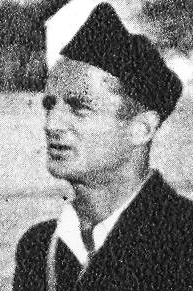
Vicko Krstulović

- Vicko Krstulović (1905–1988), served between 18 March 1952 and 6 February 1953, member of the Communist Party of Yugoslavia, which itself was renamed to League of Communists of Yugoslavia in 1952

Bakarić remained the head of government, including after the office was renamed to President of the Executive Council (Predsjednik Izvršnog vijeća), and he was the President of the 1st Executive Council of the People's Republic of Croatia between 6 February 1953 and 18 December 1953, and he remained the General Secretary of the Communist Party of Croatia throughout the period, including the rename of the party to the League of Communists of Croatia in 1952.

In 1953, the role of the President of the Presidency of the Parliament was replaced with the role of the Speaker of the Croatian Parliament (Sabor). The Speakers until 1963 were all members of the League of Communists of Yugoslavia and they included:

- Zlatan Sremec (1898–1971), served as Speaker since 1946, but in this merged capacity from 6 February 1953 to December 1953

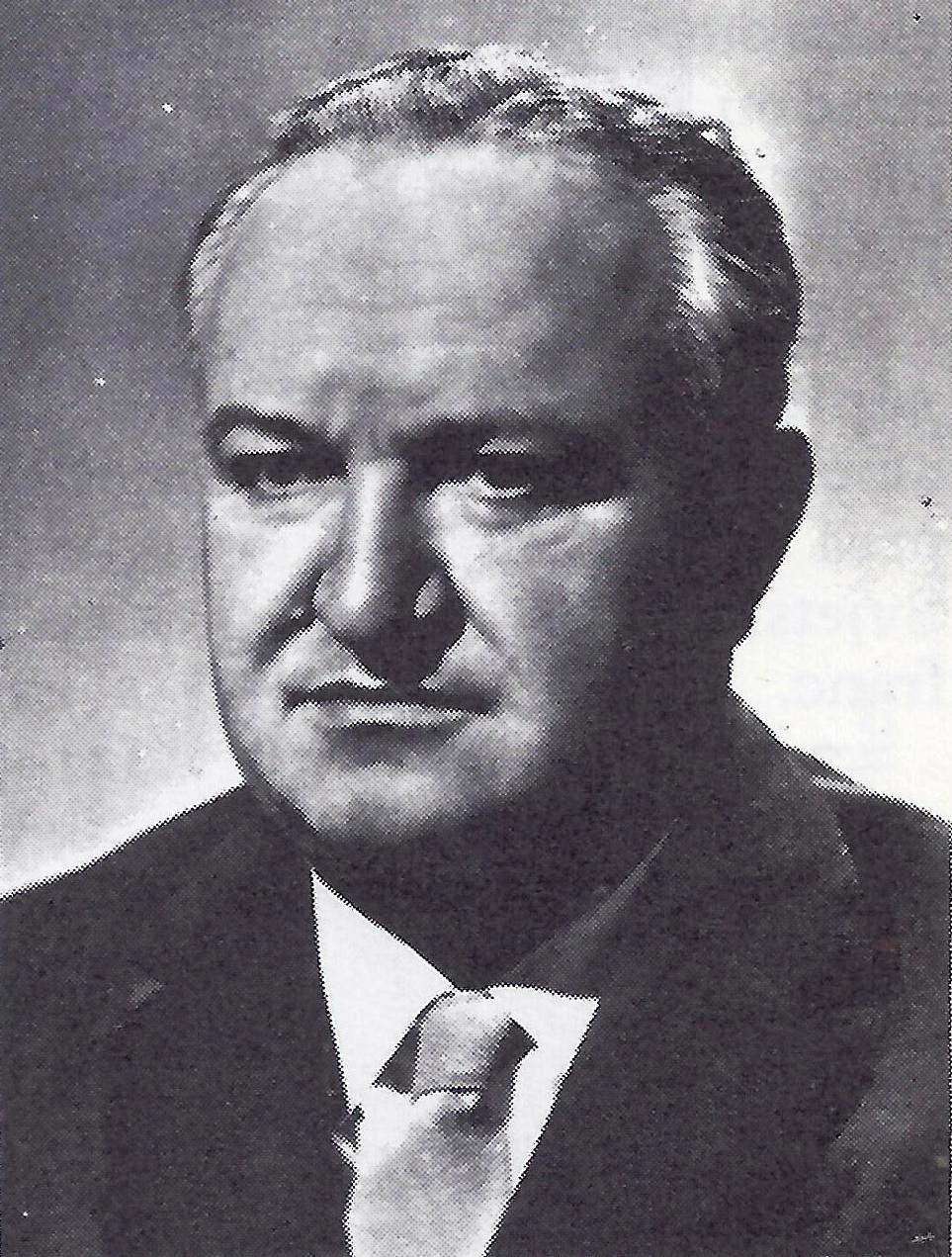
Vladimir Bakarić

- Vladimir Bakarić (1912–1983), served as Speaker between 18 December 1953 and 27 June 1963. Bakarić had the longest term to date as Croatian head of state.

Jakov Blažević was the President of the 2nd Executive Council and the 3rd Executive Council between 18 December 1953 and 10 July 1962.

Zvonko Brkić (1912–1977) was the President of the 4th Executive Council between 10 July 1962 and 27 June 1963.

=== Socialist Republic of Croatia (1963–1990) ===
Following the constitutional changes of 1963, the country was renamed, but the Speaker of the Parliament remained the highest officeholder until 1974. The Speakers during this time were likewise all members of the League of Communists of Yugoslavia:

- Ivan Krajačić (1906–1986), served between 27 June 1963 and 11 May 1967

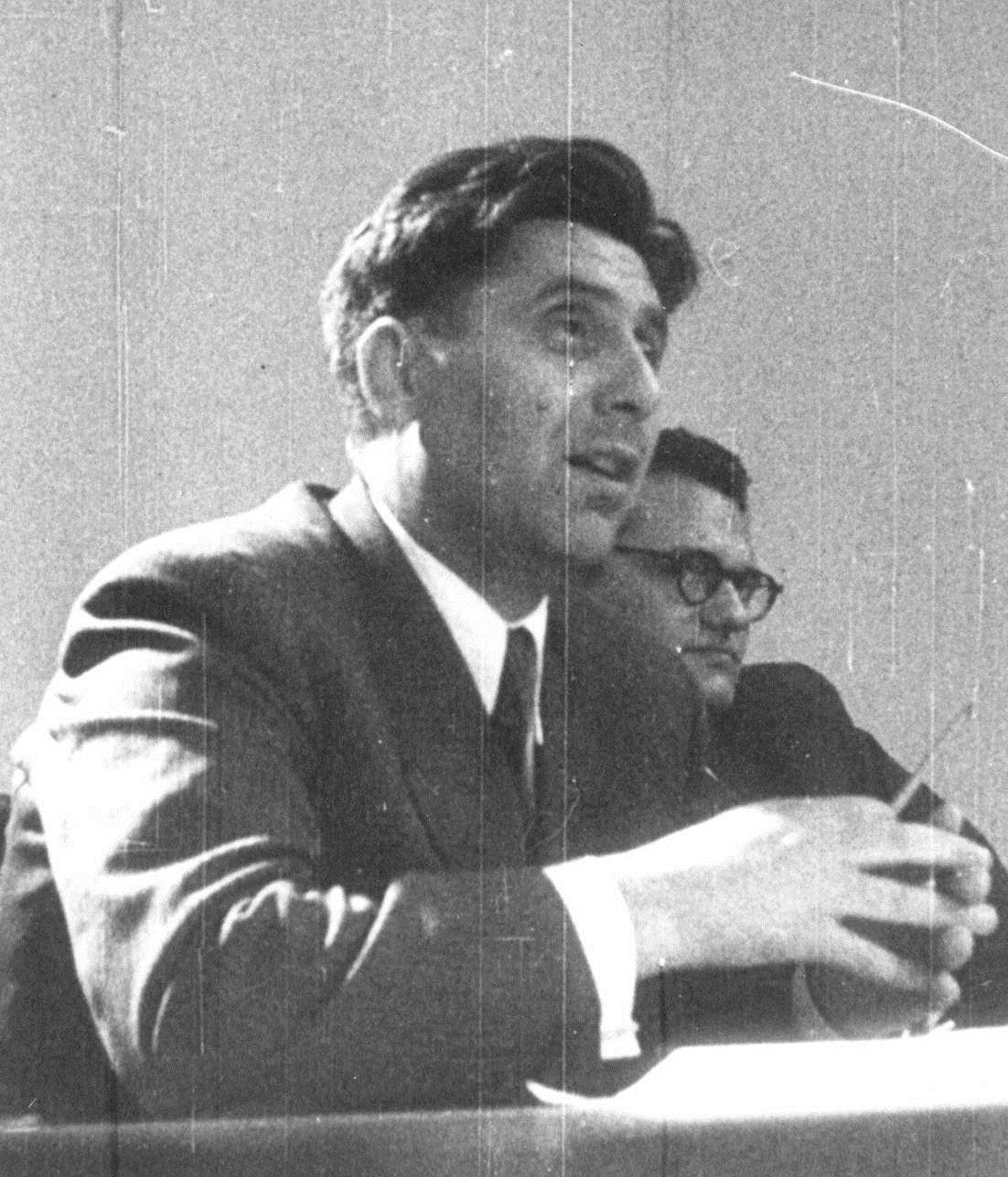
Jakov Blažević

- Jakov Blažević (1912–1996), served between 11 May 1967 and 8 May 1974
- Ivo Perišin (1925–2008), served between 8 May 1974 and 8 May 1978

On 8 May 1974, the role of the Speaker of the Parliament was made distinct from the role of the President of the Presidency. Perišin continued on as Speaker until 1978, and he also at one time held the positions of head of government, as well as Mayor of Split.

Vladimir Bakarić remained the General Secretary of the League of Communists of Croatia until 1969.

Mika Špiljak (1916–2007) was the President of the 5th Executive Council between 27 June 1963 and 11 May 1967.

Savka Dabčević-Kučar (1923–2009) was the President of the 6th Executive Council between 11 May 1967 and 8 May 1969.

Dabčević-Kučar became the General Secretary of the League of Communists of Croatia in 1969, a position in which she remained until 1971 and the events of the Croatian Spring.

Dragutin Haramija (1923–2012) was the President of the 7th Executive Council between 8 May 1969 and 28 December 1971.

Ivo Perišin (1925–2008) was the President of the 8th Executive Council between 28 December 1971 and 8 May 1974.

The Presidency of the Socialist Republic of Croatia (Croatian: Predsjedništvo Socijalističke Republike Hrvatske) was the republic-level equivalent to the collective presidency which existed at the federal level following amendments to the constitution in 1971. On 21 February 1974 a new federal Constitution was adopted which reaffirmed the collective federal presidency established a collective head of state chaired by a President of the Presidency and automatically including the federal party leader. The constituent republics adopted the same system in new constitutions of their own, with the Socialist Republic of Croatia adopting theirs the following day on 22 February. A nine-member presidency was established, chaired by a President of the Presidency and automatically including the president of the League of Communists, elected by the Parliament to a four-year term. Members could not be elected for more than two consecutive terms.

In 1974, Jakov Blažević was made the President of the Presidency, while members were Boris Bakrač, Mirko Božić, Čedo Grbić, Josip Hrnčević, Vjekoslav Ivančić, Zvonimir Jurišić and Milan Mišković, all members of the League of Communists of Croatia (SKH).

Milka Planinc was the president of the SKH, and a member ex officio of the Presidency.

In 1978, still with Jakov Blažević as the President, the members were Pero Car, Kazimir Jelovica, Zvonimir Jurišić, Milan Mišković, Jakša Petrić, Jelica Radojčević, Jakov Sirotković, and Milka Planinc continuing as the member ex officio through the presidency of SKH.

The constitution originally allowed for the president of the presidency to serve a maximum of two terms of four years. Jakov Blažević served as president of the presidency for the maximum two terms, before constitutional reforms in 1981 changed how the presidency functioned.

Jakov Sirotković (1922–2002) was the President of the 9th Executive Council between 8 May 1974 and 9 May 1978.

Petar Fleković (1932–) was the President of the 10th Executive Council between 9 May 1978 and 10 May 1982.

The death of federal president-for-life Josip Broz Tito in 1980 brought into force constitutional articles which made the federal presidency have a rotating president, which was followed with constitutional amendments in 1981 which introduced the rotating practice into other offices, including the speaker and deputy speaker of the Federal Assembly and their equivalents in the two component chambers. Croatia introduced similar amendments into its own constitution in 1981 through which the members of the presidency would continue to be elected to four-year terms, but would rotate as presidents on an annual basis.

Between 1982 and 1986, the following people were Presidents: Marijan Cvetković (1982-1983), Milutin Baltić (1983-1984), Jakša Petrić (1984-1985), Pero Car (1985; died in office), Ema Derossi-Bjelajac (1985-1986), the latter being the first female head of state of Croatia.

The members at the time included: Mirko Božić, Marijan Cvetković (1983-1986), Tode Ćuruvija, Ema Derossi-Bjelajac (1982-1985), Jakša Petrić (1982-1984, 1985-1986), Dragutin Plašć, Milutin Baltić (1982-1983, 1984-1984), Pero Car (1982-1985)

The members ex officio as president of the League of Communists of Croatia included Jure Bilić (1982-1983), Josip Vrhovec (1983-1984), Mika Špiljak (1984-1986).

Ante Marković (1924–2011) was the President of the 11th Executive Council between 10 May 1982 and 10 May 1986.

In 1986 additional constitutional amendments were enacted which increased the length served as President of the Presidency to two years.

Between 1986 and 1990, the following people were Presidents: Ante Marković (1986-1988), who would later serve as the last Prime Minister of Yugoslavia; and Ivo Latin (1988-1990).

The members of the Presidency at the time were Ivo Latin (1986-1988), Tomislav Kovač, Vlado Dobec, Mirko Knežević, Ante Marković (1988-1989 when he resigned to take the role of President of the Federal Executive Council), Olga Miličić-Arslanagić, Mato Grbac, Mirko Sinobad

Stanko Stojčević was the member ex officio as president of the League of Communists of Croatia.

Antun Milović (1934–2008) was the President of the 12th Executive Council between 10 May 1986 and 30 May 1990.

Ivica Račan was the president of SKH between 13 December 1989 and 1990.

While the presidency was controlled by the League of Communists for the most of its history, in 1989 they introduced the first democratic reforms, when constitutional amendments were approved which removed the stipulation that the President of the League of Communists automatically serve as a member of the Presidency of the Socialist Republic.

=== Republic of Croatia (1990–1991) ===
After the first multi-party elections in 1990, constitutional amendments were put in place which renamed the Socialist Republic of Croatia to simply the Republic of Croatia. Accordingly, the Presidency of the Socialist Republic of Croatia become the Presidency of the Republic of Croatia and the total number of members was reduced from nine to seven.

In 1990, Franjo Tuđman became the President of the Presidency, from the Croatian Democratic Union (HDZ).

The members of the Presidency of the Republic were: Krešimir Balenović (HDZ), Dušan Bilandžić (SKH-SDP), Dalibor Brozović (HDZ), Josip Manolić (HDZ; resigned in 1990 to take the role of Prime Minister of Croatia), Antun Vrdoljak (HDZ), Milojko Vučković (independent).

After the first multi-party elections, the President of the Executive Council of Croatia was Stjepan Mesić who served between 30 May 1990 and 25 July 1990, so the Cabinet of Stjepan Mesić started as the 14th Executive Council.

The constitutional reforms in 1990 also renamed the office of the head of government to President of the Government.

The December 1990 Constitution abolished the collective presidency altogether in favor of a singular President of the Republic of Croatia, with the final President of the Presidency Tuđman becoming the inaugural President of the Republic.

== See also ==
- Politics of Croatia
