= 1st Executive Council of the People's Republic of Croatia =

The 1st Executive Council of the People's Republic of Croatia was that state's executive organ of government in 1953.

== Background ==
The Central Committee of the Communist Party of Yugoslavia held its V. Plenum in May 1952 when a new Constitutional Law was proposed. On 13 January 1953 the National Assembly adopted a new Constitutional Law on the Basics of Social and Political Organization of the Federal People's Republic of Yugoslavia and Federal Governing Organs. The law established a new Federal Executive Council as the executive organ of government. The constituent republics subsequently adopted matching laws. On 5 February 1953 the Parliament of the People's Republic of Croatia adopted the Constitutional Law of the People's Republic of Croatia on the Basics of Social and Political Organization and Republican Governing Organs which created the republic's new Executive Council. The following day the Parliament adopted an enabling law for the new Constitutional Law, and then proceeded to elect the first Executive Council.

The Executive Council organized elections to the Parliament, now divided into a Republican Council and a Council of Producers, on 22 November 1953. A joint session of the two newly elected legislative councils elected a new Executive Council on 18 December 1953. Jakov Blažević replaced Vladimir Bakarić as president of the Executive Council, while he moved to the position of President of the Parliament.

=== Members ===
Portfolio	Member	Took office	Left office	Party
President	Vladimir Bakarić	6 February 1953	18 December 1953	SKH
Vice President	Jakov Blažević	6 February 1953	18 December 1953	SKH
Vice President	Božidar Maslarić	6 February 1953	18 December 1953	SKH
Secretary	Veljko Drakulić	6 February 1953	18 December 1953	SKH
Member	Anka Berus	6 February 1953	18 December 1953	SKH
Member	Antun Biber	6 February 1953	18 December 1953	SKH
Member	Zvonko Brkić	6 February 1953	18 December 1953	SKH
Member	Marijan Cvetković	6 February 1953	18 December 1953	SKH
Member	Dušan Diminić	6 February 1953	18 December 1953	SKH
Member	Franjo Gaži	6 February 1953	18 December 1953	SKH
Member	Ante Jurjević	6 February 1953	18 December 1953	SKH
Member	Ivan Krajačić	6 February 1953	18 December 1953	SKH
Member	Slavko Komar	6 February 1953	18 December 1953	SKH
Member	Hinko Krizman	6 February 1953	18 December 1953	SKH
Member	Vicko Krstulović	6 February 1953	18 December 1953	SKH
Member	Kata Pejnović	6 February 1953	18 December 1953	SKH
Member	Mile Počuča	6 February 1953	18 December 1953	SKH
Member	Nikola Rački	6 February 1953	18 December 1953	SKH
Member	Svetozar Rittig	6 February 1953	18 December 1953	SKH
Member	Dragutin Saili	6 February 1953	18 December 1953	SKH
Member	Nikola Sekulić	6 February 1953	18 December 1953	SKH
Member	Marijan Stilinović	6 February 1953	18 December 1953	SKH
Member	Mika Špiljak	6 February 1953	18 December 1953	SKH
Member	Miloš Žanko	6 February 1953	18 December 1953	SKH

== Bibliography ==
- Bukvić, Nenad (2012). "Izvršno vijeće Sabora Narodne Republike Hrvatske : ustroj i djelovanje (1953-1963)". Arhivski vjesnik (in Croatian). 55: 9–46.
- Petranović, Branko; Zečević, Momčilo (1988). Jugoslavija 1918-1988 : tematska zbirka dokumenata. Rad.
- Štambuk-Škalić, Marina (2002). "Prilog poznavanju institucija: Sabor Narodne Republike Hrvatske saziv 1953-1963". Arhivski vjesnik (in Croatian). 45: 83–102.
