= 3rd Executive Council of the People's Republic of Croatia =

The 3rd Executive Council of the People's Republic of Croatia was the state's executive organ of government from 1958 to 1963. The Executive Council was voted in at a joint session of the Republican Council and the Council of Producers on 10 April 1958.

== Members ==
Portfolio	Member	Took office	Left office	Party
President	Jakov Blažević	18 December 1953	10 July 1962	SKH
President	Zvonko Brkić	10 July 1962	27 June 1963	SKH
Vice President	Ivan Krajačić	18 December 1953	27 June 1963	SKH
Vice President	Božidar Maslarić	18 December 1953	10 July 1962	SKH
Vice President	Marin Cetinić	30 December 1959	10 February 1961	SKH
Vice President	Milutin Baltić	10 July 1962	27 June 1963	SKH
Vice President	Miloš Žanko	10 July 1962	27 June 1963	SKH
Secretary	Jure Ivezić	18 December 1953	27 June 1963	SKH
Member	Lutvo Ahmetović	10 April 1958	27 June 1963	SKH
Member	Boris Bakrač	10 April 1958	10 July 1962	SKH
Member	Marko Belinić	10 April 1958	10 July 1962	SKH
Member	Anka Berus	10 April 1958	10 February 1961	SKH
Member	Antun Biber	10 April 1958	10 July 1962	SKH
Member	Pero Car	10 April 1958	27 June 1963	SKH
Member	Dušan Dragosavac	10 April 1958	30 May 1960	SKH
Member	Beška Frntić	10 April 1958	10 July 1962	SKH
Member	Franjo Gaži	18 December 1953	27 June 1963	SKH
Member	Čedo Grbić	1 February 1955	27 June 1963	SKH
Member	Stjepan Iveković	6 July 1959	27 June 1963	SKH
Member	Blaž Kalafatić	10 April 1958	27 June 1963	SKH
Member	Radojka Katić	10 April 1958	27 June 1963	SKH
Member	Vicko Krstulović	10 April 1958	27 June 1963	SKH
Member	Milan Majstorović	10 April 1958	10 July 1962	SKH
Member	Milan Mišković	10 April 1958	27 June 1963	SKH
Member	Antun Pavlinić	10 April 1958	27 June 1963	SKH
Member	Antun Pavlinić	10 February 1962	27 June 1963	SKH

== Bibliography ==
- Bukvić, Nenad (2012). "Izvršno vijeće Sabora Narodne Republike Hrvatske : ustroj i djelovanje (1953-1963)". Arhivski vjesnik (in Croatian). 55: 9–46.
- Štambuk-Škalić, Marina (2002). "Prilog poznavanju institucija: Sabor Narodne Republike Hrvatske saziv 1953-1963". Arhivski vjesnik (in Croatian). 45: 83–102.
