= 2nd Executive Council of the People's Republic of Croatia =

The 2nd Executive Council of the People's Republic of Croatia was that state's executive organ of government from 1953 to 1958. The Executive Council was voted in at a joint session of the Republican Council and the Council of Producers on 18 December 1953.

== Members ==
Portfolio	Member	Took office	Left office	Party
President	Jakov Blažević	18 December 1953	10 April 1958	SKH
Vice President	Ivan Krajačić	18 December 1953	10 April 1958	SKH
Vice President	Božidar Maslarić	18 December 1953	10 April 1958	SKH
Secretary	Jure Ivezić	18 December 1953	10 April 1958	SKH
Member	Milutin Baltić	18 December 1953	10 April 1958	SKH
Member	Marko Belinić	11 July 1955	10 April 1958	SKH
Member	Anka Berus	18 December 1953	10 April 1958	SKH
Member	Zvonko Brkić	18 December 1953	10 April 1958	SKH
Member	Ivan Buković	18 December 1953	10 April 1958	SKH
Member	Marin Cetinić	18 December 1953	10 April 1958	SKH
Member	Marijan Cvetković	18 December 1953	4 February 1957	SKH
Member	Franjo Gaži	18 December 1953	10 April 1958	SKH
Member	Čedo Grbić	1 February 1955	10 April 1958	SKH
Member	Ivica Gretić	18 December 1953	10 April 1958	SKH
Member	Blaž Kalafatić	4 February 1957	10 April 1958	SKH
Member	Milan Majstorović	1 February 1955	10 April 1958	SKH
Member	Antun Pavlinić	18 December 1953	10 April 1958	SKH
Member	Ivo Sarajčić	18 December 1953	16 December 1955	SKH
Member	Vajo Skendžić	18 December 1953	10 April 1958	SKH
Member	Miloš Žanko	16 December 1955	10 April 1958	SKH

== Bibliography ==
- Bukvić, Nenad (2012). "Izvršno vijeće Sabora Narodne Republike Hrvatske : ustroj i djelovanje (1953-1963)". Arhivski vjesnik (in Croatian). 55: 9–46.
- Štambuk-Škalić, Marina (2002). "Prilog poznavanju institucija: Sabor Narodne Republike Hrvatske saziv 1953-1963". Arhivski vjesnik (in Croatian). 45: 83–102.
