= Savka Dabčević-Kučar =

Croatian politician

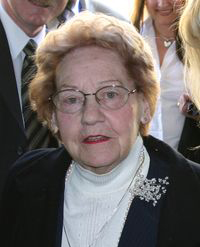
- Dabčević-Kučar in 2007

Secretary of the League of Communists of Croatia
- In office 8 May 1969 – 14 December 1971
- President: Jakov Blažević
- Prime Minister: Dragutin Haramija
- Preceded by: Vladimir Bakarić
- Succeeded by: Milka Planinc

President of the Executive Council of the Socialist Republic of Croatia
- In office 11 May 1967 – 8 May 1969
- President: Jakov Blažević
- Preceded by: Mika Špiljak
- Succeeded by: Dragutin Haramija

President of the Croatian People's Party
- In office 13 October 1990 – 1995
- Preceded by: Position established
- Succeeded by: Radimir Čačić

Personal details
- Born: Savka Dabčević; 6 December 1923 Korčula, Kingdom of Serbs, Croats and Slovenes (modern Croatia)
- Died: 6 August 2009 (aged 85) Zagreb, Croatia
- Party: SKJ (1943–1971); HNS (1990–2009)
- Spouse: Ante Kučar (m. 1951; died 2003)

Savka Dabčević-Kučar (6 December 1923 – 6 August 2009) was a Croatian politician. She was one of the most influential Croatian female politicians during the communist period, especially during the Croatian Spring when she was deposed. She returned to politics during the early days of Croatian independence as the leader of the Coalition of People's Accord and the Croatian People's Party. From 1967 to 1969 she served as the Chairman of the 5th Executive Council (Prime Minister) of the Socialist Republic of Croatia, one of eight constituent republics and autonomous provinces of the Socialist Federative Republic of Yugoslavia. She was the first woman in Europe to be appointed head of government of a political entity and the first female in the post-World War II Croatia to hold an office equivalent to a head of government.

== Early life ==
Savka Dabčević-Kučar (née Dabčević) was born on 6 December 1923 in Korčula, then in the Kingdom of Serbs, Croats and Slovenes, today in Croatia. During the World War II, she joined Yugoslav Partisans, the Communist Party of Yugoslavia (KPJ) and the Communist Party of Croatia (KPH) in 1943. In 1944, she was transferred to the El Shatt refugee camp. In 1946 she enrolled in the study of economics at the University of Zagreb and two years later transferred to the Leningrad University – returning to complete her study in Zagreb in 1949 following the Tito–Stalin split. She married Ante Kučar in 1951.

Dabčević-Kučar received PhD in economics from the University of Zagreb in 1955. She became a member of the central committee of the League of Communists of Croatia (SKH - previously known as the KPH) in 1959. Two years later, she received a grant from the Ford Foundation and studied economic development and regional planning in the United States and France. In 1963, she was appointed a member of the SKH's task group formed to develop a proposal for economic reforms. In 1965 she became a professor at the Faculty of Economics of the University of Zagreb.

Dabčević-Kučar came into the public spotlight in the late 1960s as a member of a younger and more reformist generation of the League of Communists of Yugoslavia leaders. With the tacit blessing of Josip Broz Tito, she and Miko Tripalo became the leaders of the SKH. In 1967 she became the President of the Executive Council (Prime Minister) of the Socialist Republic of Croatia, a constituent republic of SFR Yugoslavia, giving her the distinction of being the first female head of government of a political entity in Europe.

== Career ==
In the late 1960s, the party adopted a new course demanding greater autonomy for Croatia within Yugoslavia and freedoms for the people. Her policy, propagated through mass rallies, became a movement later called the Croatian Spring, being one of the '68 student revolutions. Consequently, Dabčević-Kučar became one of the most popular political leaders at the time, being affectionately called "Savka, queen of Croatians".

Not everyone was happy with the new course. Open manifestations of Croatian nationalism created tensions in ethnically mixed areas, which served as an argument for the Yugoslav People's Army and more conservative elements of the party who wanted the movement suppressed. At the same time, the Croatian leadership was also challenged by a student movement with even more radical demands.

In December 1971 Tito held a party leadership conference in Karađorđevo, Serbia, and publicly turned against the Croatian Spring in the form of "comradely critic", (an internal communist way to openly criticize its party members when they, according to majority opinion, do not follow "the party line"). This led to Dabčević-Kučar's response to the critic, (published in newspapers during December) in which she accepted all criticism except those intended to show her as nationalist, and enemy of the socialist self-governing system, to which she publicly expressed loyalty. She resigned from the Central Committee of the Croatian Communist Party and, ultimately, from public life. She was replaced by Milka Planinc.

When multi-party democracy finally arrived in Croatia, Dabčević-Kučar and Tripalo returned to the public stage, using their long-accumulated reputation. They refused to endorse a single party, and instead initiated the formation of a broad coalition of the moderate middle, called the Coalition of People's Accord. The coalition failed to make a major impact at the 1990 elections, with most opting for Franjo Tuđman and his Croatian Democratic Union party.

With the coalition falling apart, Dabčević-Kučar and Tripalo formed their own party, the Croatian People's Party (HNS), in late 1990. This new party was intended to attract moderates and had high hopes for the 1992 presidential and parliamentary elections, being perceived as the strongest opposition party in Croatia.

As a presidential candidate Savka Dabčević trailed third behind Dražen Budiša. The HNS refused to form coalitions with other opposition parties, allowing the ruling Croatian Democratic Union to win some constituencies with less than fifth of all votes. With the party humiliated, and nearly bankrupt after a lavish but ineffective campaign, the aging Dabčević-Kučar left the party leadership to the younger Radimir Čačić.

== Personal life ==
She died in Zagreb at the age of 85. She was an agnostic.

Political offices
Preceded by Mika Špiljak	President of the Executive Council of SR Croatia; 1967–1969	Succeeded by Dragutin Haramija
Party political offices
Preceded by Vladimir Bakarić	Secretary of the Central Committee of the League of Communists of Croatia; 1969–1971	Succeeded by Milka Planinc
