= Ivo Perišin =

Croatian economist, politician and academician

8th President of the Assembly of the Socialist Republic of Croatia
- In office 8 May 1974 – 8 May 1978
- Prime Minister: Jakov Sirotković
- Preceded by: Jakov Blažević
- Succeeded by: Jure Bilić

President of the Executive Council of the Socialist Republic of Croatia
- In office 28 December 1971 – 8 May 1974
- President: Jakov Blažević
- Preceded by: Dragutin Haramija
- Succeeded by: Jakov Sirotković

Mayor of Split
- In office 1965–1967
- Preceded by: Ante Zelić
- Succeeded by: Jakša Miličić

Personal details
- Born: 4 July 1925 Kaštela, Kingdom of Serbs, Croats, and Slovenes (modern Croatia)
- Died: 30 October 2008 (aged 83) Zagreb, Croatia
- Party: League of Communists of Yugoslavia
- Education: University of Zagreb; University of Belgrade
- Profession: Economist

Ivo Perišin (4 July 1925 – 30 October 2008) was a Croatian economist, politician and academician. He held various senior governmental posts in the Socialist Republic of Croatia in the 1970s and was mayor of Split, Croatia from 1965 to 1967.

In 1949, Perišin graduated from the University of Zagreb Faculty of Economics. He continued studies at the University of Belgrade, and defended his doctoral thesis at the Belgrade Faculty of Economics in 1959.

From 1956 he was a professor of economics at the University of Zagreb. From 1965 to 1967 he was the Mayor of Split. He served as the Governor of the National Bank of Yugoslavia from 1 November 1969 to 31 December 1971. He was President of the Assembly of SR Croatia from 1974 to 1978.

He was admitted as full member of the Yugoslav Academy of Sciences and Arts (today Croatian Academy of Sciences and Arts) on 17 May 1990.

Political offices
Preceded by Jakov Blažević	Speaker of the Croatian Parliament; April 1974 – 1978	Succeeded by Jakov Blažević as President of the Presidency
Preceded by Jakov Blažević	Speaker of the Croatian Parliament; April 1974 – 1978	Succeeded by Jure Bilić as Speaker of Parliament
Preceded by Dragutin Haramija	President of the Executive Council of SR Croatia; December 1971 – April 1974	Succeeded by Jakov Sirotković
Preceded by Ante Zelić	Mayor of Split; 1965 - 1967	Succeeded by Jakša Miličić
