= Jure Bilić =

Yugoslav communist politician

9th Speaker of the Croatian Parliament
- In office 8 May 1978 – 10 May 1982
- President: Jakov Blažević
- Prime Minister: Petar Fleković
- Preceded by: Ivo Perišin
- Succeeded by: Jovo Ugrčić

President of the League of Communists of Croatia
- In office May 1982 – July 1983
- President: Marijan Cvetković; Milutin Baltić
- Prime Minister: Ante Marković
- Preceded by: Milka Planinc
- Succeeded by: Josip Vrhovec

Personal details
- Born: 12 September 1922 Makarska, Kingdom of Serbs, Croats and Slovenes (modern Croatia)
- Died: 27 January 2006 (aged 83) Zagreb, Croatia
- Party: League of Communists of Yugoslavia (SKJ)

Jure Bilić (12 September 1922 – 27 January 2006) was a Yugoslav communist politician.

Bilić was born in Makarska in 1922. In 1941 he joined the Yugoslav Partisans and became a member of the Communist Party of Yugoslavia.

After the World War II, Bilić was the State Secretary for Agriculture in Croatia. His ascendancy to high-ranking positions in the Party began in the early 1970s, after the downfall of the Croatian Spring movement. He served as President of the Parliament of the Socialist Republic of Croatia (1978–1982), Chairman of the Central Committee of the League of Communists of Croatia (1982–1983) and member of the Presidency of the Central Committee of the League of Communists of Yugoslavia (1983–1986).

A party committee vote removed him from office in 1986.

Political offices
Preceded by Ivo Perišin	Speaker of the Croatian Parliament; 1978 – 8 May 1982	Succeeded by Jovo Grčić
Party political offices
Preceded by Milka Planinc	President of the Presidency of the Central Committee of the League of Communists of Croatia; 1982–1983	Succeeded by Josip Vrhovec
