= Mika Špiljak =

Croatian politician

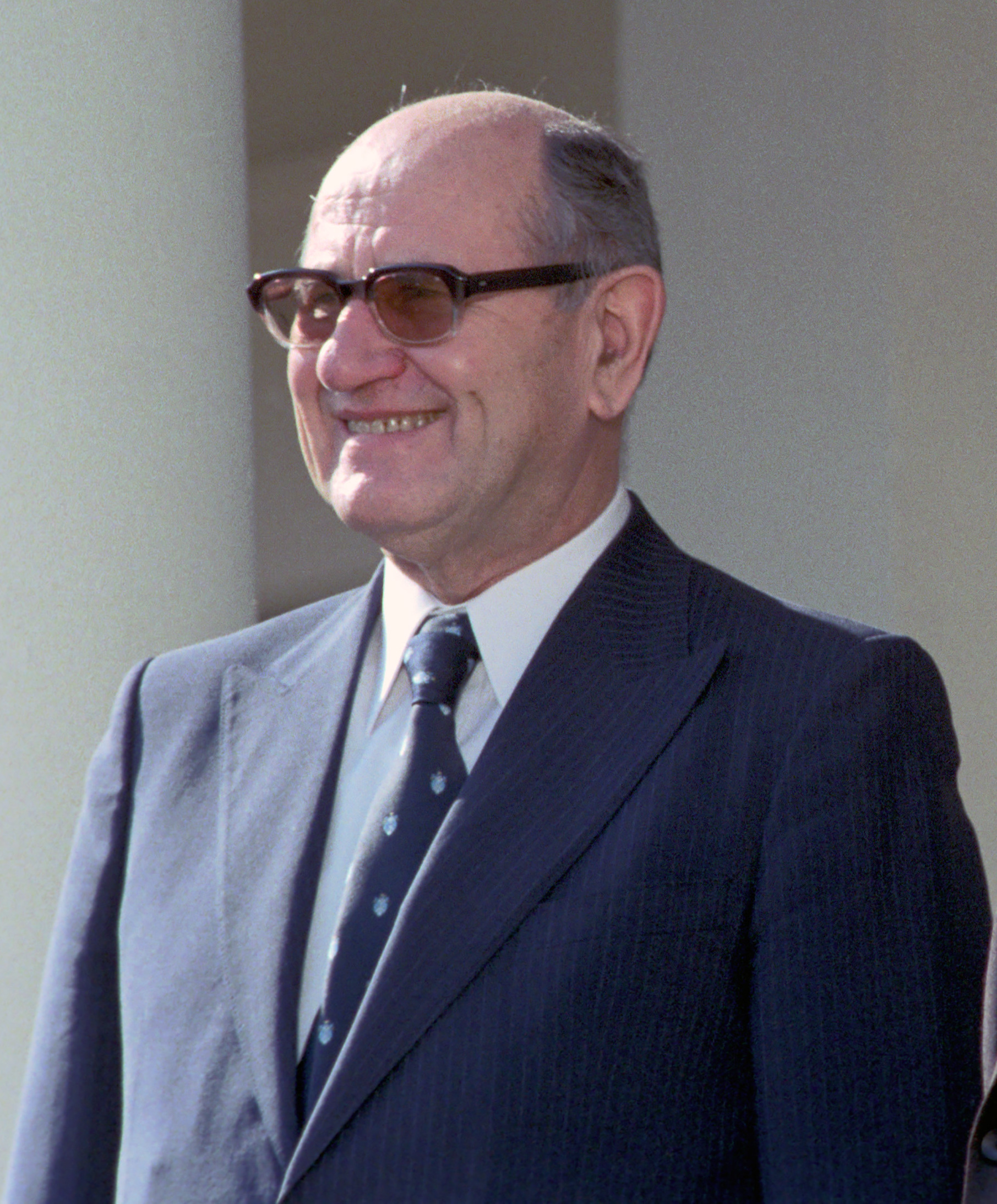
- Špiljak in 1984

5th President of the Presidency of Yugoslavia
- In office 15 May 1983 – 15 May 1984
- Prime Minister: Milka Planinc
- Preceded by: Petar Stambolić
- Succeeded by: Veselin Đuranović

2nd Member of the Presidency of Yugoslavia for SR Croatia
- In office 16 January 1983 – 15 May 1984
- Preceded by: Vladimir Bakarić
- Succeeded by: Josip Vrhovec

21st Prime Minister of Yugoslavia President of the Federal Executive Council
- In office 16 May 1967 – 18 May 1969
- President: Josip Broz Tito
- Preceded by: Petar Stambolić
- Succeeded by: Mitja Ribičič
Additional positions
10th President of the League of Communists of Croatia
In office 14 May 1984 – 18 May 1986
Prime Minister	Ante Marković
Preceded by	Josip Vrhovec
Succeeded by	Stanko Stojčević
4th President of the Executive Council of SR Croatia
In office 27 June 1963 – 11 May 1967
President	Jakov Blažević
Preceded by	Zvonko Brkić
Succeeded by	Savka Dabčević-Kučar
Mayor of Zagreb
In office 1949–1950
Preceded by	Dragutin Saili
Succeeded by	Milivoj Rukavina

Personal details
- Born: 28 November 1916 Odra Sisačka, Sisak, Croatia-Slavonia, Austria-Hungary (modern Croatia)
- Died: 18 May 2007 (aged 90) Zagreb, Croatia
- Party: League of Communists of Yugoslavia

Mika Špiljak (28 November 1916 – 18 May 2007) was a Croatian politician who spent most of his political career as a member of the League of Communists of Yugoslavia in the SFR Yugoslavia. He served as President of the Presidency of Yugoslavia from 1983 to 1984 and was also Prime Minister of Yugoslavia from 1967 to 1969.

Špiljak was previously President of the Executive Council of SR Croatia from 1963 to 1967. He was also President of the League of Communists of Croatia from 1984 to 1986.

== Early years ==
He was born in Odra Sisačka (part of Sisak), in the Kingdom of Croatia-Slavonia (present-day Croatia). His father Dragutin was a railway worker. Špiljak began working at the age of 16. He joined the Communist Party in 1938 and fought with Partisans during World War II.

== Career ==
From 1949 to 1950, he was mayor of Zagreb.

In 1963, Špiljak was appointed the Chairman of the Executive Council of Croatia and served until his 1967 appointment as the President of the Federal Executive Council, Yugoslavia's Prime Minister. He served in that capacity until 1969.

Špiljak then served as President of the collective Presidency of Yugoslavia from 1983 until 1984. While holding this office, Špiljak opened the 1984 Winter Olympics.

He was subsequently elected President of the Central Committee of the League of Communists of Croatia from 1984 until 1986.

== Death ==
He died in 2007 at the age of 90. He was cremated in Zagreb.

In the 2000s (decade), German courts linked Špiljak to the assassination of Croatian emigrant Stjepan Đureković in 1983. After the hearings in Germany, all the links connecting him to the assassination were dropped.

Political offices
Preceded by Petar Stambolić	President of the Presidency of Yugoslavia; 1983–1984	Succeeded by Veselin Đuranović
Preceded by Petar Stambolić	Prime Minister of Yugoslavia; 1967–1969	Succeeded by Mitja Ribičič
Preceded by Zvonko Brkić	President of the Executive Council of Croatia; 1963–1967	Succeeded by Savka Dabčević-Kučar
Preceded by Dragutin Saili	Mayor of Zagreb; 1945–1949	Succeeded by Milivoj Rukavina
Party political offices
Preceded by Josip Vrhovec	President of the Presidency of the Central Committee of the League of Communists of Croatia; 1984–1986	Succeeded by Stanko Stojčević
