= Vladimir Nazor =

First Croatian president

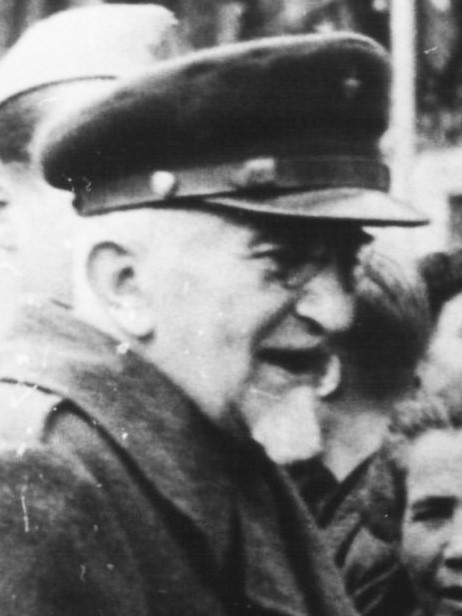
- Nazor in 1944

President of the ZAVNOH^{[a]}
- In office 13 June 1943 – 21 July 1945
- Preceded by: Office established
- Succeeded by: Himself (as Speaker of Parliament)

1st Speaker of the Croatian Parliament
- In office 21 July 1945 – 19 June 1949
- Prime Minister: Pavle Gregorić (as Minister for Croatia); Vladimir Bakarić
- Preceded by: Himself (as President of the ZAVNOH)
- Succeeded by: Karlo Mrazović

President of the Presidency of the Croatian Parliament^{[b]}
- In office 26 February 1946 – 19 June 1949
- Prime Minister: Vladimir Bakarić
- Preceded by: Himself (as Speaker of Parliament)
- Succeeded by: Karlo-Gašpar Mrazović

Personal details
- Born: 30 May 1876 Postira, Dalmatia, Austria-Hungary
- Died: 19 June 1949 (aged 73) Zagreb, PR Croatia, FPR Yugoslavia
- Party: Unitary National Liberation Front (1942–45); National Front (1945–49)
- Education: University of Zagreb; University of Graz
- ^a The President of the ZAVNOH (the wartime deliberative council) formally held the position of head of state.^b The President of the Presidency of the Croatian Parliament was the office of the head of state, the Speaker of Parliament was a separate office.

Vladimir Nazor (30 May 1876 – 19 June 1949) was a Croatian poet and politician. During and after World War II in Yugoslavia, he served as the first President of the Presidency of the Croatian Parliament (Croatian head of state), and first Speaker of the Croatian Parliament.

Nazor is a well-known poet, writer, translator, and humanist. He was not an active politician until 1941, but had a significant political influence through ethical aspects of his work during prewar Kingdom of Yugoslavia.

== Early career ==
Nazor's early work paralleled the rise of the Young Croatian literary movement. He acquired much literary popularity in Croatia writing about folk legends and stories, including Big Joseph (Veli Jože) (1908), which features a helpful and kind-hearted giant named Jože living in the town of Motovun (Inner Istria). His verses in Hrvatski kraljevi (Croatian Kings) (1912) established him as a prominent patriot poet. Istrian Tales (Istarske priče) (1913) showcased his storytelling style. By illuminating the personality of the South Slavs through tales of Croatia, he contributed to the creation of the Yugoslav national consciousness.

Nazor supported the opposition alliance led by Vladko Maček in the 1938 Yugoslavian election. During World War II, on 30 December 1941, Nazor became a member of the Croatian Academy of Sciences and Arts by government decree. In 1942 he escaped from Zagreb with poet Ivan Goran Kovačić in a boat across the river Kupa, sublimed in the poem The Boat on the Kupa (Čamac na Kupi), and then joined the Partisans. Nazor became one of Josip Broz Tito's closest associates and the President of Croatia's World War II assembly, the ZAVNOH. He went on to write a war diary With Partisans (S partizanima) (1943–1945).

Nazor began his political career as the head of the State Anti-fascist Council for the National Liberation of Croatia (ZAVNOH), the provisional Croatian World War II deliberative assembly, before becoming head of the first post-war Croatian National Parliament (Narodni Sabor). In that post, he was, by law, concurrently the first (non-monarchical) head of state of Croatia, and the de facto first head of state of the current Croatian republic. His position carried little real political power, which was instead invested in the office of the President of the Government and informally with the Secretary of the Communist Party of Croatia.

Nazor's opus after WWII mostly consisted of works strongly supportive of Tito's communist regime. His hagiographic poem Titov Naprijed (Tito's Forward) was famously memorized by generations of schoolchildren throughout Yugoslavia well into the 80s. Other poems such as Drug Tito (Comrade Tito), Naš vođa (Our Leader), Uz Maršala Tita (With Marshal Tito), and many others had a similar socialist realism style bolstering Tito's cult of personality. However, it is a matter of debate whether Nazor really became a fervent communist or supported the regime mostly out of fear and opportunism. Reflecting on his position under the communist government in his diary Večernje bilješke (1945), Nazor notes "They gave me a lot of honor but no power!" ("Doduše, dodijeliše mi čast, ali ne i vlast!").

== As a poet ==
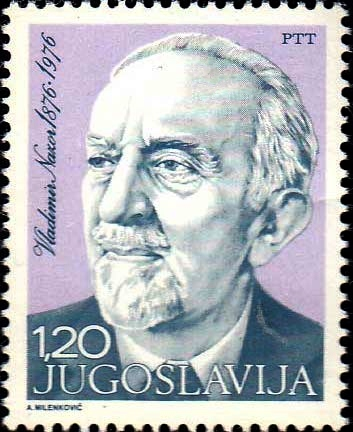
Stamp featuring Nazor's likeness issued in May 1976 to commemorate the 100th anniversary of his birth.

One of Nazor's main prose works is the extensive novel Loda the Shepherd (Pastir Loda) (1938). The work describes the history of his native island of Brač as told by Loda, a faun, one of the last of that kind on the island.

In poetry, Nazor's creative way began with metaphysical transcendental philosophy and materialistic revolutionary action, prior to rational scheme and harmonic larpourlartistic crystal structure and interior protest against artistic verbalizing in Futurism, Dadaism, Expressionism, and Surrealism, as well as instructive didactics of socialist realism. Therefore, his opus incorporates a variety of style tendencies, from neoclassical and surrealistic to symbolism. Some of his works contain rhythm forcing, vowels shortening for adjusting the number of syllables and progressing the sentence to the next verse, as well as his use of unusual and archaic words

Nazor wrote over 500 poems. The early phase of Nazor's poetry work is mostly object of scholars' research now, but Galérien's Poeme (Galiotova pesan) from that time (1903), describing suffering and sadness of a galley slave, attains universal meaning as condemnation of oppression and still stands as one of the most expressive disapproval of slavery.

Nazor reached the highest scope in poems of so-called pagan phase, published in books of verse Lyrics (Lirika) (1910) and New Poems (Nove pjesme) (1913).

Nazor spoke several languages and translated Italian (Dante – Divina Commedia, Giosuè Carducci, Giovanni Pascoli, Gabriele d'Annunzio), German (Goethe, Heine), French (Hugo, Alfred de Musset), and English (Shakespeare).

Nazor was buried in Mirogoj Cemetery. Since 1959, Croatia has named a state award for artistic achievement the Vladimir Nazor Award. In 2008, a total of 306 streets in Croatia were named after Nazor, making him the second most common person eponym of streets in the country behind Matija Gubec.

== Works ==
- Na vrhu jezika i pera, Croatian Publishing and Bibliographic Institute, 1942

His works have been translated into following languages (incomplete list):

- Italian
- Hungarian
- Slovenian
- German

== Relevant literature ==
- Gálvez, Francisco Javier Juez. 2021. "'Llenar este hueco de curiosidad e interest por lo lejano' Vladimir Nazor ne la revisita litaria Escorial." Studia Romanica et Anglica Zagrebiensia LXVI 233-240.

Political offices
New title	President of the ZAVNOH; 1943–1945	Succeeded by Himself as Speaker of Parliament
Preceded by Himself as President of the ZAVNOH	Speaker of the Croatian Parliament; 1945–1946	Succeeded by Zlatan Sremec
Preceded by Himself as Speaker of Parliament	President of the Presidency of the Croatian Parliament; 1946–1949	Succeeded by Karlo-Gašpar Mrazović
