= Speaker of the Croatian Parliament =

Presiding officer in the Croatian Parliament

- Predsjednik Hrvatskog sabora
- Flag of the speaker of the Croatian Parliament

- Incumbent; Gordan Jandroković since 5 May 2017
- Croatian Parliament
- Style: Mr Speaker (when addressed in the Sabor)
- Type: Presiding officer
- Seat: Sabor Palace, Zagreb
- Nominator: Political parties
- Appointer: Croatian Parliament; traditionally appointing nominee of the largest party
- Term length: Contemporaneous to legislative period
- Constituting instrument: Constitution of Croatia
- Formation: 30 May 1990
- First holder: Žarko Domljan
- Deputy: Deputy Speakers of the Croatian Parliament
- Salary: €5314 monthly

The speaker of the Croatian Parliament (Croatian: Predsjednik Hrvatskog sabora, literally the president of the Croatian Parliament) is the presiding officer in the Croatian Parliament, Croatia's legislative body.

Under Article 97 of the constitution of Croatia, the speaker of the Croatian Parliament is the only constitutional deputy to the president of Croatia and serves as acting president if the elected president vacates the office before the expiration of the five-year presidential term due to either death, resignation or removal from office (as determined by the Constitutional Court). In this case an early presidential election must be held within 60 days of the vacancy in the presidency having occurred and the speaker shall serve as acting president until the newly elected president is sworn in for a full five-year term of office.

Under the same article of the Constitution, the president of Croatia may unilaterally choose to temporarily delegate authority to the speaker of the Parliament for shorts periods of time, such as whenever the president is not present in the country, is ill, or is on vacation, until the president wishes to fully resume authority once again. However, in case of longer periods of the president's illness or incapacitation, and especially in those cases when the president is not able to delegate authority to speaker, the responsibility of determining when a speaker should assume or renounce temporary authority rests upon the Constitutional Court, which acts upon the recommendation of the government of Croatia.

The incumbent speaker of the Croatian Parliament is Gordan Jandroković of the Croatian Democratic Union, having taken office on 5 May 2017 following the resignation of the previous speaker.

== Duties and competences ==
According to the Croatian Constitution and the Parliamentary Rules of Procedure (Standing Orders of the Croatian Parliament), president of the Parliament:

- shall substitute for the president of the Republic if the latter is prevented from performing his/her duties
- represents Parliament
- convenes and presides over sessions of Parliament
- submits motions from authorised sponsors for stipulated procedures
- proposes the agenda for sessions of Parliament
- handles the procedures for the enactment of laws and other regulations
- co-ordinates the activities of working bodies
- signs laws and other regulations enacted by Parliament
- directs enacted laws to the president of the Republic for proclamation
- manages relations between Parliament and the Government
- co-signs decisions on the appointment of the prime minister and the appointment of members of the Government
- accepts sponsorships ex-officio
- approves, taking into account available funds, the travel of parliamentary deputies when they have been invited, as parliamentary deputies, to *visit another state or foreign organisation
- co-ordinates the work of standing delegations of Parliament in international parliamentary and other institutions
- determines, at the proposal of deputy clubs, the composition of temporary delegations of Parliament in visits to foreign representative bodies and *organisations, such that they generally correspond to the party structure of Parliament and reflect the appropriate representation of both sexes
- determines the composition of temporary delegations in cases when he/she is invited abroad as the speaker of Parliament
- designates representatives of Parliament at ceremonial and other occasions, adhering to the representation of both sexes
- submits a request, at the proposal of the Secretary of Parliament, for the securing of funds for the work of Parliament and the Parliamentary Staff Service
- ensures the protection of the rights and exercise of the duties of parliamentary deputies
- presides over the oaths of elected and appointed officials, when specified by law and Standing Orders of the Parliament
- performs other activities determined by the Constitution of the Republic of Croatia, law and Standing Orders of the Parliament

== List ==
This is the list of speakers of the Croatian Parliament.

Independent (1)
League of Communists of Croatia (9) (Note: A constituent party of the League of Communists of Yugoslavia; known as the Communist Party of Croatia until 1952. Succeeded by the Social Democratic Party of Croatia in 1990.)
Croatian Democratic Union (8)
Croatian Peasant Party (1)
Social Democratic Party (2)
Bridge of Independent Lists (1)

No.	Speaker		Lifespan	Term of office — Electoral mandates		Party	Notes	Assembly
1	Vladimir Nazor	Vladimir Nazor	1876–1949	13 June 1943	19 June 1949	Independent (Note: Member of the Unitary National Liberation Front, i.e. the National Front)	1943–45 President of the ZAVNOH (entailing the function of head of state); In 1945 became head of state as the President of the Presidency of the Parliament (until his death in office).	
–		Antun Babić	1899–1989	19 June 1949	15 October 1949	Croatian Peasant Party	Vice-President of the Presidency of the Parliament.	
–		Mile Počuča	1899–1980	19 June 1949	15 October 1949	League of Communists of Croatia	Vice-President of the Presidency of the Parliament.	
2	Karlo Mrazović	Karlo Mrazović	1902–1987	15 October 1949	18 March 1952	League of Communists of Croatia	President of the Presidency of the Parliament.	
3	Vicko Krstulović	Vicko Krstulović	1905–1988	18 March 1952	6 February 1953	League of Communists of Croatia	President of the Presidency of the Parliament.	
4	Zlatan Sremec	Zlatan Sremec	1898–1971	6 February 1953	18 December 1953	League of Communists of Croatia	Since 6 February 1953, with the abolition of the Presidency, Sremec served as formal head of state of Croatia through the post of President of the People's Assembly of the People's Republic of Croatia (Speaker of Parliament).	
5	Vladimir Bakarić	Vladimir Bakarić	1912–1983	18 December 1953	27 June 1963	League of Communists of Croatia	Formal head of state of Croatia (as President of the People's Assembly). Longest term to date as Croatian speaker, also served as President of the Executive Council. People's Hero of Yugoslavia	
6	Ivan Krajačić	Ivan Krajačić	1906–1986	27 June 1963	11 May 1967	League of Communists of Croatia	Formal head of state of Croatia (as Speaker of Parliament).	
7	Jakov Blažević	Jakov Blažević	1912–1996	11 May 1967	8 May 1974	League of Communists of Croatia	Formal head of state of Croatia (as Speaker of Parliament, from 1974 servedas President of the Presidency of the Socialist Republic).	
8	Ivo Perišin	Ivo Perišin	1925–2008	8 May 1974	8 May 1978	League of Communists of Croatia	After the establishment of the Presidency of Croatia on 8 May 1974, the function of de jure Croatian head of state transferred to that body. Perišin also at one time held the positions of President of the Executive Council of the Socialist Republic of Croatia, and Mayor of Split.	
9	Jure Bilić	Jure Bilić	1922–2006	8 May 1978	10 May 1982	League of Communists of Croatia		
10	Jovo Grčić	Jovo Ugrčić	1923–2005	10 May 1982	11 May 1983	League of Communists of Croatia		
11	Milan Rukavina-Šain	Milan Rukavina-Šain	1926–1995	11 May 1983	10 May 1984	League of Communists of Croatia		
12	Ivo Latin	Ivo Latin	1929–2002	10 May 1984	10 May 1985	League of Communists of Croatia		
13	Josip Zmajić	Josip Zmajić	1917–1998	10 May 1985	10 May 1986	League of Communists of Croatia		
14	Anđelko Runjić	Anđelko Runjić	1938–2015	10 May 1986	30 May 1990	League of Communists of Croatia		
Following the 1990 parliamentary election and constitutional reforms
15 (1)	Žarko Domljan	Žarko Domljan	1932–2020	30 May 1990	7 September 1992	Croatian Democratic Union		Speaker of the First Assembly of Parliament (1990–1992)
15 (1)	Žarko Domljan	Žarko Domljan	1932–2020	1990		Croatian Democratic Union		Speaker of the First Assembly of Parliament (1990–1992)
16 (2)	Stjepan Mesić	Stjepan Mesić	1934–	7 September 1992	24 May 1994	Croatian Democratic Union		Speaker of the Second Assembly of Parliament (1992–1995)
16 (2)	Stjepan Mesić	Stjepan Mesić	1934–	1992		Croatian Democratic Union		Speaker of the Second Assembly of Parliament (1992–1995)
17 (3)	Nedjeljko Mihanović	Nedjeljko Mihanović	1930–2022	24 May 1994	28 November 1995	Croatian Democratic Union		Speaker of the Second Assembly of Parliament (1992–1995)
17 (3)	Nedjeljko Mihanović	Nedjeljko Mihanović	1930–2022	—		Croatian Democratic Union		Speaker of the Second Assembly of Parliament (1992–1995)
18 (4)	Vlatko Pavletić	Vlatko Pavletić	1930–2007	28 November 1995	2 February 2000	Croatian Democratic Union	Acting President for President Franjo Tuđman during the latter's incapacitation, beginning on 26 November 1999 and ending with Tuđman's death on 10 December 1999. Continued serving as Acting President (now as official head of state) from 10 December 1999 until 2 February 2000, when the 4th Assembly of Parliament was instituted.	Speaker of the Third Assembly of Parliament (1995–1999)
18 (4)	Vlatko Pavletić	Vlatko Pavletić	1930–2007	1995		Croatian Democratic Union	Acting President for President Franjo Tuđman during the latter's incapacitation, beginning on 26 November 1999 and ending with Tuđman's death on 10 December 1999. Continued serving as Acting President (now as official head of state) from 10 December 1999 until 2 February 2000, when the 4th Assembly of Parliament was instituted.	Speaker of the Third Assembly of Parliament (1995–1999)
19 (5)	Zlatko Tomčić	Zlatko Tomčić	1945–	2 February 2000	22 December 2003	Croatian Peasant Party	Acting President from the constituting of the 4th Assembly of Parliament on 2 February 2000 until Stjepan Mesić took office as elected President for a 5-year term on 18 February 2000.	Speaker of the Fourth Assembly of Parliament (2000–2003)
19 (5)	Zlatko Tomčić	Zlatko Tomčić	1945–	2000		Croatian Peasant Party	Acting President from the constituting of the 4th Assembly of Parliament on 2 February 2000 until Stjepan Mesić took office as elected President for a 5-year term on 18 February 2000.	Speaker of the Fourth Assembly of Parliament (2000–2003)
20 (6)	Vladimir Šeks	Vladimir Šeks	1943–	22 December 2003	11 January 2008	Croatian Democratic Union		Speaker of the Fifth Assembly of Parliament (2003–2008)
20 (6)	Vladimir Šeks	Vladimir Šeks	1943–	2003		Croatian Democratic Union		Speaker of the Fifth Assembly of Parliament (2003–2008)
21 (7)	Luka Bebić	Luka Bebić	1937–	11 January 2008	22 December 2011	Croatian Democratic Union		Speaker of the Sixth Assembly of Parliament (2008–2011)
21 (7)	Luka Bebić	Luka Bebić	1937–	2007		Croatian Democratic Union		Speaker of the Sixth Assembly of Parliament (2008–2011)
22 (8)	Boris Šprem	Boris Šprem	1956–2012	22 December 2011	30 September 2012	Social Democratic Party	Died in office.	Speaker of the Seventh Assembly of Parliament (2011–2015)
22 (8)	Boris Šprem	Boris Šprem	1956–2012	2011		Social Democratic Party	Died in office.	Speaker of the Seventh Assembly of Parliament (2011–2015)
—	Josip Leko	Josip Leko	1948–	30 September 2012	10 October 2012	Social Democratic Party	Acting Speaker from death of Boris Šprem until election as permanent Speaker.	Speaker of the Seventh Assembly of Parliament (2011–2015)
23 (9)	Josip Leko	Josip Leko	1948–	10 October 2012	28 December 2015	Social Democratic Party		Speaker of the Seventh Assembly of Parliament (2011–2015)
23 (9)	Josip Leko	Josip Leko	1948–	—		Social Democratic Party		Speaker of the Seventh Assembly of Parliament (2011–2015)
24 (10)	Željko Reiner	Željko Reiner	1953–	28 December 2015	14 October 2016	Croatian Democratic Union		Speaker of the Eight Assembly of Parliament (2015–2016)
24 (10)	Željko Reiner	Željko Reiner	1953–	2015		Croatian Democratic Union		Speaker of the Eight Assembly of Parliament (2015–2016)
25 (11)	Božo Petrov	Božo Petrov	1979–	14 October 2016	5 May 2017	Bridge of Independent Lists	Resigned from office on 4 May 2017.	Speaker of the Ninth Assembly of Parliament (2016–2020)
25 (11)	Božo Petrov	Božo Petrov	1979–	2016		Bridge of Independent Lists	Resigned from office on 4 May 2017.	Speaker of the Ninth Assembly of Parliament (2016–2020)
26 (12)	Gordan Jandroković	Gordan Jandroković	1967–	5 May 2017	Incumbent	Croatian Democratic Union		Speaker of the Ninth Assembly of Parliament (2016–2020)
26 (12)	Gordan Jandroković	Gordan Jandroković	1967–	5 May 2017	Incumbent	Croatian Democratic Union		Speaker of the Tenth Assembly of Parliament (2020–)
26 (12)	Gordan Jandroković	Gordan Jandroković	1967–	2016, 2020, 2024		Croatian Democratic Union		Speaker of the Tenth Assembly of Parliament (2020–)

== Statistics ==
#	Speaker	Date of birth	Age at ascension	Time in office	Age at retirement	Date of death
1	Žarko Domljan	September 14, 1932	57 years, 258 days	2 years, 65 days	59 years, 323 days	September 5, 2020
2	Stjepan Mesić	December 24, 1934	57 years, 258 days	1 years, 259 days	59 years, 151 days	Living
3	Nedjeljko Mihanović	February 16, 1930	64 years, 78 days	1 year, 207 days	65 years, 285 days	January 27, 2022
4	Vlatko Pavletić	December 2, 1930	64 years, 330 days	4 years, 97 days	69 years, 62 days	September 19, 2007
5	Zlatko Tomčić	October 7, 1945	54 years, 118 days	3 years, 323 days	58 years, 75 days	Living
6	Vladimir Šeks	January 1, 1943	60 years, 355 days	4 years, 20 days	65 years, 10 days	Living
7	Luka Bebić	August 21, 1937	70 years, 142 days	3 years, 345 days	74 years, 122 days	Living
8	Boris Šprem	April 14, 1956	55 years, 251 days	0 years, 283 days	56 years, 169 days	September 30, 2012
9	Josip Leko	September 19, 1948	61 years, 24 days	3 years, 78 days	67 years, 99 days	Living
10	Željko Reiner	May 28, 1953	62 years, 213 days	0 years, 290 days	63 years, 138 days	Living
11	Božo Petrov	October 16, 1979	36 years, 364 days	0 years, 203 days	37 years, 201 days	Living
12	Gordan Jandroković	August 2, 1967	49 years, 276 days	9 years, 198 days (Ongoing)	Incumbent	Living

== See also ==
- Speaker of the Chamber of Counties of Croatia
- President of Croatia
  - List of presidents of Croatia
- Prime Minister of Croatia
  - List of prime ministers of Croatia by time in office
  - List of cabinets of Croatia
- Secretary of the League of Communists of Croatia
- List of heads of state of Yugoslavia
- Prime Minister of Yugoslavia
- Politics of Croatia
