= Gornja Vrba =

- Interactive map of Gornja Vrba
- Location within Croatia
- Coordinates: 45°09′N 18°04′E
- Country: Croatia
- County: Brod-Posavina County

Government
  - Mayor: Daniel Grgić (HDZ)

Area
  - Total: 20.1 km^{2} (7.8 sq mi)

Population (2021)
  - Total: 2,168
  - Density: 108/km^{2} (279/sq mi)
- Time zone: UTC+1 (CET)
  - Summer (DST): UTC+2 (CEST)
- Website: gornja-vrba.hr

Gornja Vrba is a village and a municipality in Brod-Posavina County, Croatia. In 2001, out of 2,559 inhabitants 99% said they were Croats. (2001 census)

== Demographics ==
In 2021, the municipality had 2,168 residents in the following 2 settlements:

- Donja Vrba, population 514
- Gornja Vrba, population 1654
Gornja Vrba: Population trends 1857–2021
v

population	648	714	667	753	784	806	774	892	1033	1191	1467	1741	1933	1991	2559	2512	2168
	1857	1869	1880	1890	1900	1910	1921	1931	1948	1953	1961	1971	1981	1991	2001	2011	2021

Sources: Croatian Bureau of Statistics publications

== Notable residents ==
- Zvonko Brkić
