= Vladimir Bakarić =

Yugoslav-Croatian communist revolutionary and politician

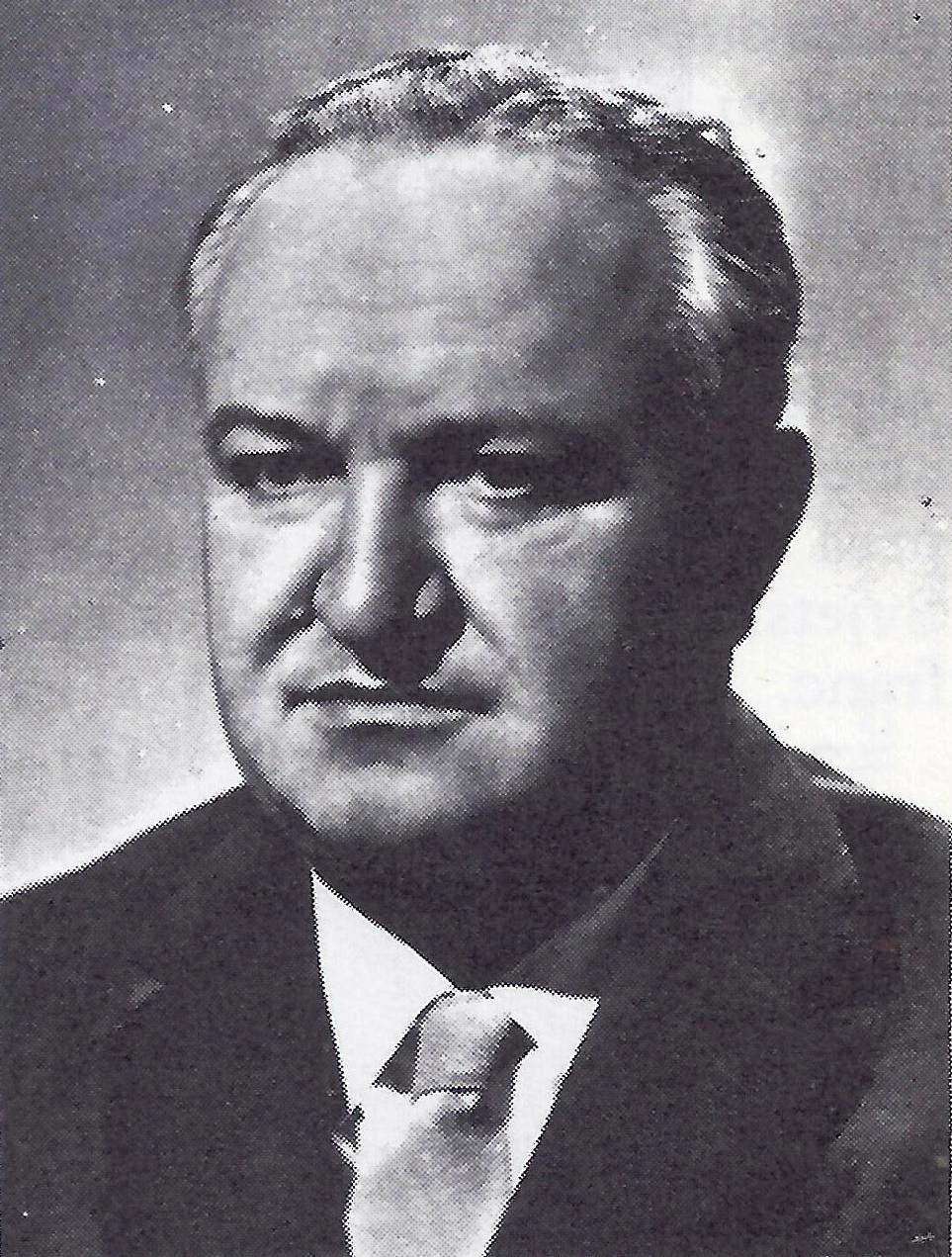
- Vladimir Bakarić by 1966

Member of the Presidency of Yugoslavia for SR Croatia
- In office 15 May 1974 – 16 January 1983
- Preceded by: Jakov Blažević; Đuro Kladarin; Milan Mišković
- Succeeded by: Mika Špiljak

5th Speaker of the Croatian Parliament^{[a]}
- In office 18 December 1953 – 27 June 1963
- Prime Minister: Jakov Blažević; Zvonko Brkić; Mika Špiljak
- Preceded by: Zlatan Sremec
- Succeeded by: Ivan Krajačić

President of the Executive Council of the People's Republic of Croatia^{[b]}
- In office 14 April 1945 – 18 December 1953
- President: Vladimir Nazor; Karlo-Gašpar Mrazović; Vicko Krstulović; Zlatan Sremec
- Preceded by: Pavle Gregorić (as Minister for Croatia)
- Succeeded by: Jakov Blažević

Secretary of the League of Communists of Croatia
- In office 1948 – May 1969
- President: Vladimir Nazor; Karlo-Gašpar Mrazović; Vicko Krstulović; Zlatan Sremec; Himself; Ivan Krajačić; Jakov Blažević
- Prime Minister: Himself; Jakov Blažević; Zvonko Brkić; Mika Špiljak; Savka Dabčević-Kučar
- Preceded by: Andrija Hebrang
- Succeeded by: Savka Dabčević-Kučar

Personal details
- Born: 8 March 1912 Velika Gorica, Croatia-Slavonia, Austria-Hungary (modern Croatia)
- Died: 16 January 1983 (aged 70) Zagreb, SR Croatia, SFR Yugoslavia
- Party: League of Communists of Yugoslavia (SKJ)
- ^a The Speaker of the Parliament was the head of state of SR Croatia between 6 February 1953 and 8 May 1974.^b Post was known as "President of the Government of the People's Republic of Croatia" until 6 February 1953.

Vladimir Bakarić (pronounced [ʋlǎdimiːr bǎkarit͡ɕ]; 8 March 1912 – 16 January 1983) was a Yugoslav and Croatian communist revolutionary and a politician. He served as the President of the Government (later the Executive Council) of the People's Republic of Croatia from 1945 to 1953 and Speaker of the Croatian Parliament from 1953 to 1963. In addition, he was Secretary of the League of Communists of Croatia for 2 decades from 1948 to 1969, where he became a close collaborator with President Josip Broz Tito.

== Early life ==
Bakarić was born on 8 March 1912 in Velika Gorica, which was then part of the Kingdom of Croatia-Slavonia in Austria-Hungary. His father was a local judge in Gospić. After finishing his elementary education in Gospić, he attended secondary school in Ogulin and Zagreb. He entered the University of Zagreb as a law student, where he quickly joined the Communist movement. He participated in the revolutionary workers' movement there in 1932 and in 1933 officially joined the Communist Party of Yugoslavia. In 1935, he was elected secretary of the party at the University of Zagreb, and graduated later that year. Upon graduating, he worked in the courts as a defense lawyer from 1936 to 1941 while studying for his doctorate in law.

== Political career ==
Bakarić helped to organise the partisan resistance in the Independent State of Croatia during World War II. From 1944 to 1969, he was chief secretary or the chairman of the League of Communists of Croatia and as such was a close collaborator of President Josip Broz Tito.

From 1964 to 1974, he was a member of the Council of the Federation, and since 1974 he has been a member of the Presidency of the SFRY, where he served as vice president from May 15, 1975, to May 15, 1976, and was re-elected to that position in May 1982.

Together with Edvard Kardelj, he belonged to the more liberal wing of the Yugoslav political elite and was known for his statement on the need to "federate the federation" (federiranje federacije), a reference to the struggle between Yugoslav unitarists, who advocated giving more powers to the central government, and federalists, who wanted to shift power to the republics. However, Bakarić was usually extremely careful in his public pronouncements on policy and wary of radical statements.

== See also ==
- Socialist Federal Republic of Yugoslavia

Political offices
Preceded by Zlatan Sremec	Speaker of the Croatian Parliament; December 1953 – December 1963	Succeeded by Ivan Krajačić
Preceded by Pavle Gregorić as Minister for Croatia	President of the Executive Council of SR Croatia; 14 April 1945 – December 1953	Succeeded by Jakov Blažević
Party political offices
Preceded by Andrija Hebrang	Secretary of the Central Committee of the League of Communists of Croatia; 1948 – 1969	Succeeded by Savka Dabčević-Kučar
