= Anđelko Runjić =

Croatian politician (1938–2015)

Anđelko Runjić (1938–2015) was a Croatian politician, economist and diplomat who served as 14th Speaker of the Croatian Parliament from 1986 to 1990 and Ambassador of Yugoslavia in the Soviet Union from 1990 to 1991.

== Personal life ==
He was born in 1938 in Perković, Croatia and died in September 15, 2015. He received Doctorate in Law from Faculty of Economics and Business, University of Zagreb. He also served as Professor of Economic History at Faculty of Economics and Business, University of Zagreb. At the time of his death, he was married and father of two children. He was the last ambassador of Yugoslavia in the Soviet Union.
