= Odra Sisačka =

- Village
- Location within Croatia
- Coordinates: 45°30′N 16°21′E
- Country: Croatia
- County: Sisak-Moslavina County
- Municipality: Sisak

Area
  - Total: 1.8 km^{2} (0.69 sq mi)

Population (2021)
  - Total: 687
  - Density: 380/km^{2} (990/sq mi)
- Time zone: UTC+1 (CET)
  - Summer (DST): UTC+2 (CEST)

Odra Sisačka (Croatian pronunciation: [ôdra sǐsat͡ʃkaː] is a village in Croatia. It is part of the city of Sisak; population 823. It is connected by the D36 highway.
