= Jakov Blažević =

Croatian politician

Major General Jakov Blažević
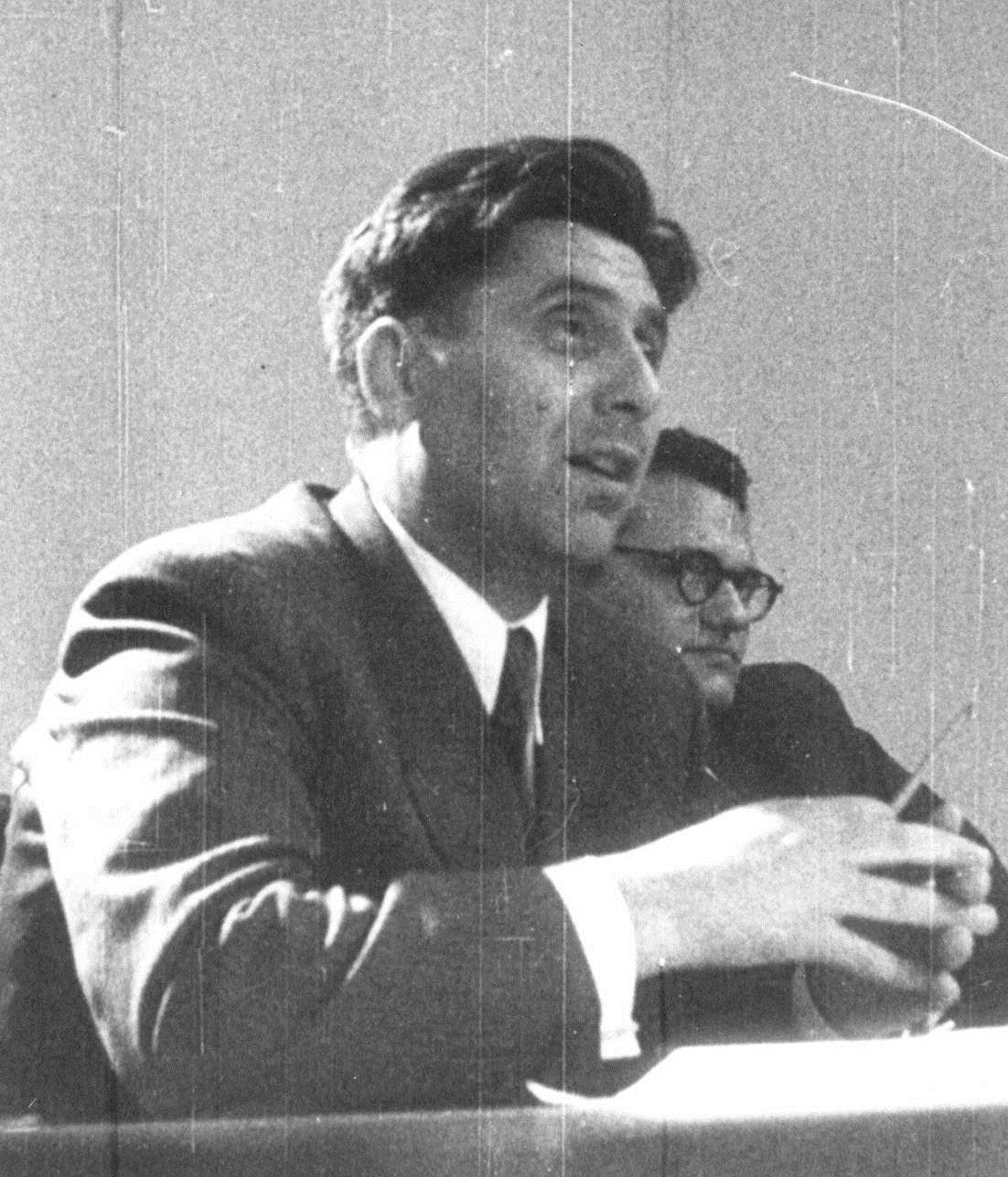
- Jakov Blažević in 1947

President of the Presidency of the Socialist Republic of Croatia
- In office 8 May 1974 – 10 May 1982
- Prime Minister: Jakov Sirotković; Petar Fleković
- Preceded by: Office established
- Succeeded by: Marijan Cvetković

7th Speaker of the Croatian Parliament^{[a]}
- In office 11 May 1967 – 8 May 1974
- Prime Minister: Savka Dabčević-Kučar; Dragutin Haramija; Ivo Perišin
- Preceded by: Ivan Krajačić
- Succeeded by: Ivo Perišin

President of the Executive Council of the People's Republic of Croatia
- In office 18 December 1953 – 10 July 1962
- President: Vladimir Bakarić; Ivan Krajačić
- Preceded by: Vladimir Bakarić
- Succeeded by: Zvonko Brkić

Personal details
- Born: 24 March 1912 Gospić, Croatia-Slavonia, Austria-Hungary (modern Croatia)
- Died: 10 December 1996 (aged 84) Zagreb, Croatia
- Party: Communist Party of Croatia
- Awards
- ^a The Speaker of the Parliament was the head of state of SR Croatia between 6 February 1953 and 8 May 1974.

Jakov Blažević (24 March 1912 – 10 December 1996) was a Croatian politician who served as president of the Executive Council of the People's Republic of Croatia, a constituent Republic of the Federal People's Republic of Yugoslavia, from 18 December 1953 to 10 July 1962.

== See also ==
- Prime Minister of Croatia
