= Anka Berus =

Croatian politician

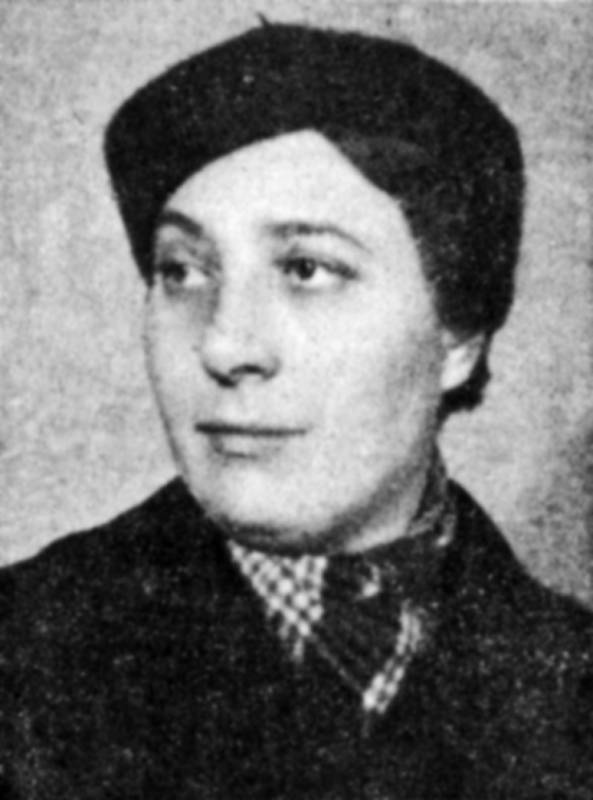
Anka Berus, before 1941

Anka Berus (16 December 1903 – 2 June 1991) was a Yugoslavian Croatian communist politician and resistance member. She became the first female cabinet minister in Croatia in 1945.

== Biography ==
Berus was born in 1903 in Split. She attended school in Split then studied at the Faculty of Philosophy in Ljubljana. After graduating, she worked at a high school and was reported by the Bishop of Split to the authorities for "corrupting" the youth due to not including prayers in her classroom.

Berus joined the Communist Party of Yugoslavia (Komunistička partija Jugoslavije, KPJ) in 1934.

Berus was a member of the resistance during the World War II. In 1939, she was interned in the concentration camp in Lepoglava until March 1940. She was then exiled to Celje.

In 1945, she became the first female cabinet minister in Croatia during the formation of the first government of the People’s Republic of Croatia. She was Finance Minister 1945-1953 and Member of the Executive Council of Yugoslavia in 1953-1960.

In 1953, Berus was appointed to the Order of the National Hero.
