= Petar Fleković =

Croatian politician (1923–)

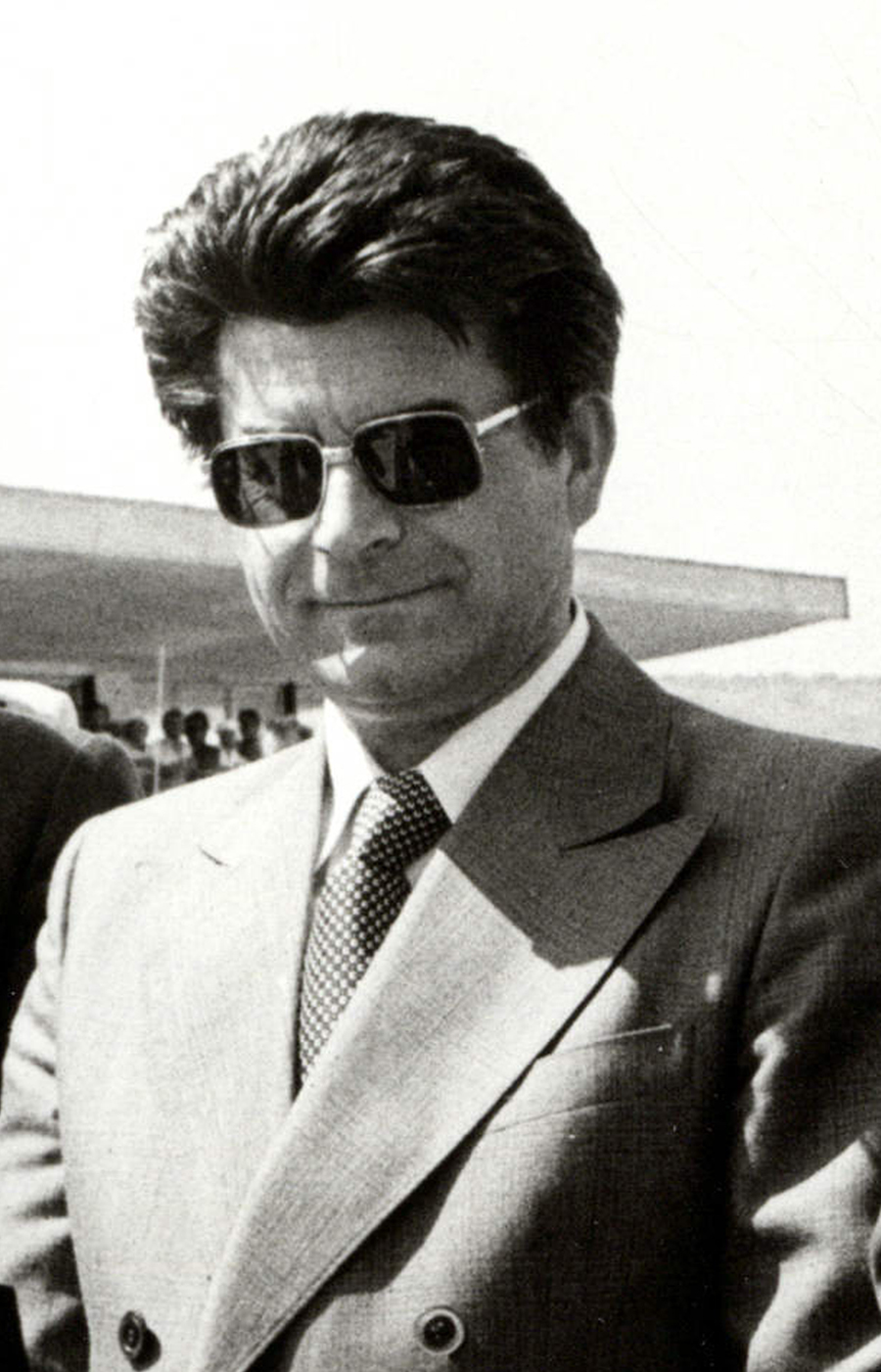
Petar Fleković

Petar Fleković (27 June 1932) is a Croatian entrepreneur and was socio-political worker in the Socialist Republic of Croatia.

== Biography ==
He is a mechanical engineer by profession.

He was a member of the Executive Board of the Central Committee of the League of Communists of Croatia from 1972 to 1978 and the President of the Izvršno vijeće Sabora SR Hrvatske from 9 May 1978 to July 1982. He was also the deputy director of Jugoturbina in Karlovac until 1978.

From 1982 to 1990, he was the general director of INA.

He retired in 1991. Today Fleković lives in Zagreb.
