= President of the League of Communists of Croatia =

Leader of the League of Communists of Croatia

- Serbo-Croatian: Predsjednik Saveza komunista Hrvatske
- Emblems of the LCY

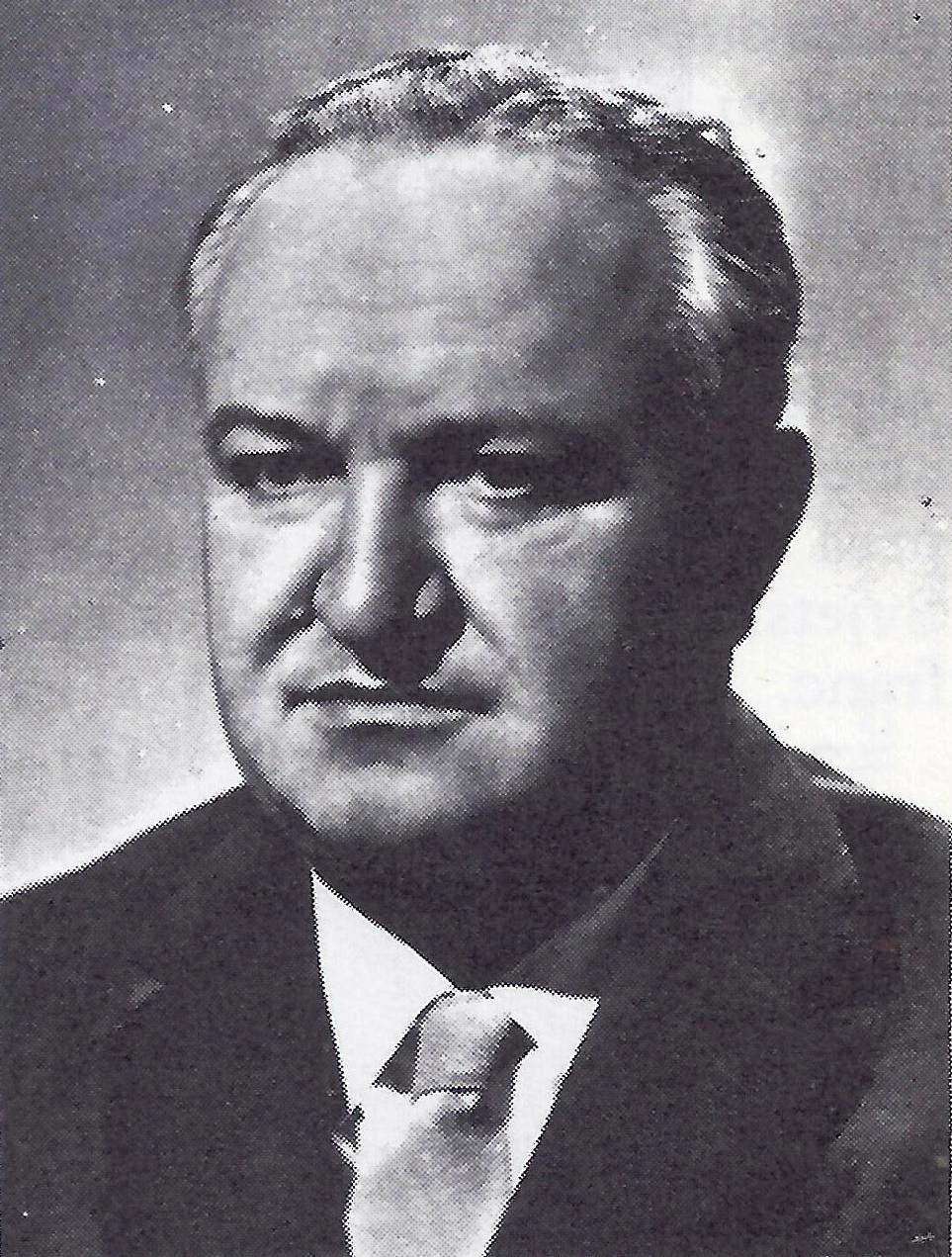
- Longest serving Vladimir Bakarić; 5 October 1944 – 28 March 1969
- Type: Party leader
- Member of: LCY Presidency and SRC Presidency
- Appointer: Central Committee
- Term length: Two years, non-renewable (1982–1991)
- Constituting instrument: LCY Charter & LCC Charter
- Formation: 1 August 1937
- First holder: Đuro Špoljarić
- Final holder: Ivica Račan
- Abolished: 3 November 1990

The president was the leader of the League of Communists of Croatia (LCC), the ruling party of the Socialist Republic of Croatia (SRC) in the Socialist Federal Republic of Yugoslavia. Party rules stipulated that the LCC Central Committee elected the president. Moreover, the Central Committee was empowered to remove the president. The president served ex officio as a member of the Presidency of the Central Committee of the League of Communists of Yugoslavia (LCY) and of the SRC Presidency. To be eligible to serve, the president had to be a member of the Presidency of the LCC Central Committee. The 9th LCC Congress instituted a two-year term limits for officeholders.

The office traces its lineage back to the office of "Political Secretary of the Provincial Committee of the Communist Party of Yugoslavia in Croatia," established after the founding of the LCY in 1919. This body had no distinct rights and was under the jurisdiction of the Yugoslav Central Committee. On 1 August 1937, the LCY convened the founding congress of the Communist Party of Croatia. On 2 August, the Central Committee of the 1st Congress elected Đuro Špoljarić as "Political Secretary of the Central Committee of the Communist Party of Croatia". The LCY 6th Congress on 2–7 November 1952, renamed the party League of Communists, and the Croatian republican branch followed suit and changed its name to League of Communists of Croatia. On 4 October 1966, the 5th Plenary Session of the Central Committee of the LCY 8th Congress abolished the office of General Secretary at the national level and replaced with the office of President. The LCC Central Committee convened a meeting on 26 October 1966 that abolished the office of secretary and established the "President of the Central Committee of the League of Communists of Croatia". The reforms passed by the LCY Central Committee plenum strengthened the powers of the republican branches and gave more powers to the Croatian party leader. The 9th LCC Congress introduced another set of reforms on 16 May 1982, which abolished the existing office and replaced it with the "President of the Presidency of the Central Committee of the League of Communists of Croatia". This office was retained until 3 November 1990, when the party changed its name to the Party of Democratic Changes.

== Office history ==
Title	Established	Abolished	Established by
Political Secretary of the Provincial Committee of the Communist Party of Yugoslavia for Croatia; Serbo-Croatian: Politički sekretar Pokrajinskog komiteta Komunističke partije Jugoslavije za Hrvatsku	23 April 1919	2 August 1937	1st Congress of the Socialist Labour Party of Yugoslavia (Communists)
Political Secretary of the Central Committee of the League of Communists of Croatia; Serbo-Croatian: Politički sekretar Centralnog komiteta Saveza komunista Hrvatske	2 August 1937	26 October 1966	1st Congress of the Communist Party of Croatia
President of the Central Committee of the League of Communists of Croatia; Serbo-Croatian: Predsjednik komiteta Saveza komunista Hrvatske	26 October 1966	16 May 1982	6th Plenary Session of the Central Committee of the 5th Congress
President of the Presidency of the Central Committee of the League of Communists of Croatia; Serbo-Croatian: Predsjednik Predsjedništva Centralnog komiteta Saveza komunista Hrvatske	16 May 1982	24 February 1991	9th Congress of the League of Communists of Croatia

== Officeholders ==
Presidents of the League of Communists of Croatia
No.	Portrait	Name	Took office	Left office	Tenure	Term of office	Birth	PM	Death	Nationality	Ref.
1		Đuro Špoljarić	2 August 1937	January 1939	1 year, 152 days	1st (1943–1948)	1906	1929	1991	Croat	
2		Rade Končar	December 1939	25 August 1940	268 days	1st (1943–1948)	1911	1934	1942	Serb	
3		Vladimir Popović	25 August 1940	December 1942	2 years, 98 days	1st (1943–1948)	1914	1932	1972	Montenegrin	
4		Andrija Hebrang	December 1942	5 October 1944	1 year, 309 days	1st (1943–1948)	1899	1919	1949	Croat	
5		Vladimir Bakarić	5 October 1944	28 March 1969	24 years, 174 days	1st–6th (1948–1974)	1912	1933	1983	Croat	
6		Savka Dabčević-Kučar	28 March 1969	13 December 1971	2 years, 260 days	6th–7th (1968–1978)	1923	1943	2009	Croat	
7		Milka Planinc	14 December 1971	16 May 1982	10 years, 153 days	7th–8th (1978–1982)	1924	1944	2010	Croat	
8		Jure Bilić	16 May 1982	23 May 1983	1 year, 7 days	9th (1982–1986)	1922	1941	2006	Croat	
9		Josip Vrhovec	23 May 1983	14 May 1984	357 days	9th (1982–1986)	1926	1944	2006	Croat	
10		Mika Špiljak	14 May 1984	18 May 1986	2 years, 4 days	9th (1982–1986)	1916	1938	2007	Croat	
11		Stanko Stojčević	18 May 1986	13 December 1989	3 years, 209 days	10th (1986–1989)	1929	1944	2009	Serb	
12		Ivica Račan	13 December 1989	3 November 1990	325 days	11th (1989–1990)	1944	1959	2007	Croat	

== Bibliography ==
- Djokić, Dejan (2023). A Concise History of Serbia. Cambridge University Press. ISBN 978-1-107-02838-8.
- Lewytzkyj, Borys; Stroynowski, Juliusz, eds. (1978). Who's Who in the Socialist Countries. K. G. Saur Verlag. ISBN 3-7940-3017-6.
- Stallaerts, Robert (2010). Historical Dictionary of Croatia. Scarecrow Press. ISBN 9780810873636.
- Stroynowski, Juliusz, ed. (1989a). Who's Who in the Socialist Countries of Europe: A–H. K. G. Saur Verlag. ISBN 3-598-10719-6.
- Stroynowski, Juliusz, ed. (1989b). Who's Who in the Socialist Countries of Europe: I–O. K. G. Saur Verlag. ISBN 3-598-10719-6.
- Stroynowski, Juliusz, ed. (1989c). Who's Who in the Socialist Countries of Europe: P–Z. K. G. Saur Verlag. ISBN 3-598-10719-6.
- Zalar, Charles, ed. (1961). Yugoslav Communism: A Critical Study. United States Government Printing Office. Archived from the original on 11 June 2023.
