= Dragutin Haramija =

Croatian politician (1923–2012)

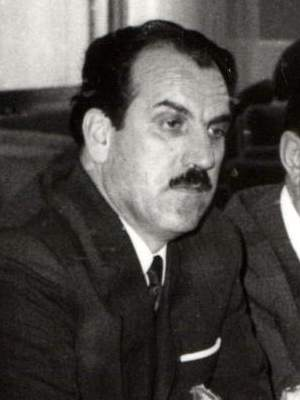
Dragutin Haramija

Dragutin Haramija (12 August 1923 – 28 November 2012) was a Croatian communist politician who served as mayor of Rijeka, then the president of the Executive Council of the Socialist Republic of Croatia from 8 May 1969 to 28 December 1971. He was denounced at the XXIth meeting of the Presidency of the Central Committee of the League of Communists of Yugoslavia held in Karađorđevo on 1 and 2 December 1971 and forced to resign. He subsequently withdrew from politics. Haramija died on 28 November 2012 at the age of 89.
