= Zvonko Brkić =

Yugoslav-Croatian politician (1912–1977)

Zvonko Brkić (18 September 1912, Gornja Vrba – 27 August 1977) was a Croatian politician who served as the president of the Executive Council of the People's Republic of Croatia, a constituent republic of the Yugoslavia, from 10 July 1962 to June 1963. He subsequently became Vice President of the Federal Assembly (1963–1967).

== See also ==
- Prime Minister of Croatia
