= Socialist Republic of Croatia =

Federated state of Yugoslavia (1943–1991)

Coordinates: 45°48′58″N 15°58′27″E

Socialist Republic of Croatia (Note: Historical names: 1943–1945: Federal State of Croatia (Serbo-Croatian: Federalna Država Hrvatska); 1946–1963: People's Republic of Croatia (Serbo-Croatian: Narodna Republika Hrvatska)) (1963–1990) Socijalistička Republika Hrvatska (Serbo-Croatian) Republic of Croatia (1990–1991) Republika Hrvatska (Serbo-Croatian)
- 1943–1991
- Flag (1947–1990) Emblem (1947–1990)
- Anthem: Lijepa naša domovino ("Our Beautiful Homeland")
- Location of Croatia in Yugoslavia
- Status: Constituent republic of Yugoslavia
- Capital: Zagreb
- Common languages: Croato-Serbian (Croatian standard)
- Demonym: Croatian
- Government: 1945–1990: Unitary communist state 1990–1991: Unitary semi-presidential republic
- Head of state
  - 1943–1949 (first): Vladimir Nazor
  - 1990–1991 (last): Franjo Tuđman
- Head of government
  - 1945–1953 (first): Vladimir Bakarić
  - 1990–1991 (last): Josip Manolić
- Leader of the LCC
  - 1943–1944 (first): Andrija Hebrang
  - 1989–1990 (last): Ivica Račan
- Legislature: Sabor
  - Upper house: Chamber of Counties (1990–1991)
  - Lower house: Chamber of Representatives (1990–1991)
- Historical era: Cold War
  - ZAVNOH: 13 and 14 June 1943
  - End of World War II: 8 May 1945
  - Croatian Spring: 1971
  - 1990 Parliamentary election: April–May 1990
  - Log Revolution: August–December 1990
  - Last Constitution adopted: 22 December 1990
  - Independence referendum: 19 May 1991
  - Independence declared: 25 June 1991
  - War of Independence: March 1991 – November 1995

Area
- 1991: 56,594 km^{2} (21,851 sq mi)

Population
  - 1991: 4,784,265
- HDI (1991): ▼0.672 medium
- ISO 3166 code: HR
Preceded by
Democratic Federal Yugoslavia
Kingdom of Hungary
Kingdom of Italy
Free Territory of Trieste
Succeeded by
Croatia
SAO Krajina
SAO Western Slavonia
SAO Eastern Slavonia, Baranja and Western Syrmia
Dubrovnik Republic
- 1. Referred to in the 1974 Constitution as the "Croatian Literary Language" and as the "Croat or Serb language"

The Socialist Republic of Croatia (Note: Serbo-Croatian: Socijalistička Republika Hrvatska), commonly abbreviated as SR Croatia and referred to as simply Croatia, was a constituent republic and federated state of the Socialist Federal Republic of Yugoslavia. By its constitution, modern-day Croatia is its direct continuation.

Along with five other Yugoslav republics, Croatia was formed during World War II and became a socialist republic after the war. It had four full official names during its 48-year existence (see below). By territory and population, it was the second largest republic in Yugoslavia, after the Socialist Republic of Serbia.

In 1990, the government dismantled the single-party system of government – installed by the League of Communists – and adopted a multi-party democracy. The newly elected government of Franjo Tuđman moved the republic towards independence, formally seceding from Yugoslavia in 1991 and thereby contributing to its dissolution.

== Names ==
Croatia became part of the Yugoslav federation in 1943 after the Second Session of the AVNOJ and through the resolutions of the ZAVNOH, Croatia's wartime deliberative body. It was officially founded as the Federal State of Croatia (Croatian: Federalna Država Hrvatska, FD Hrvatska) on 9 May 1944, at the 3rd session of the ZAVNOH. Yugoslavia, then called Democratic Federal Yugoslavia (Demokratska Federativna Jugoslavija, DFJ), was not a constitutionally socialist state, or even a republic, in anticipation of the conclusion of the war, when these issues were settled. On 29 November 1945, Democratic Federal Yugoslavia became the Federal People's Republic of Yugoslavia (Federativna Narodna Republika Jugoslavija, FNRJ), a socialist People's Republic. Accordingly, the Federal State of Croatia became the People's Republic of Croatia (Narodna Republika Hrvatska, NR Hrvatska).

On 7 April 1963, the Federal People's Republic of Yugoslavia (FPRY) was renamed the Socialist Federal Republic of Yugoslavia (SFRY). Yugoslavia (and therefore Croatia) gradually abandoned Stalinism after the Tito–Stalin split in 1948. In 1963 the People's Republic of Croatia also accordingly became the Socialist Republic of Croatia.

On 22 December 1990, a new Constitution was adopted, under which the Socialist Republic of Croatia was simply renamed as the Republic of Croatia. It was under this constitution that Croatia became independent on 25 June 1991.

The republic is commonly referred to simply as Croatia.

== Establishment ==
=== World War II ===
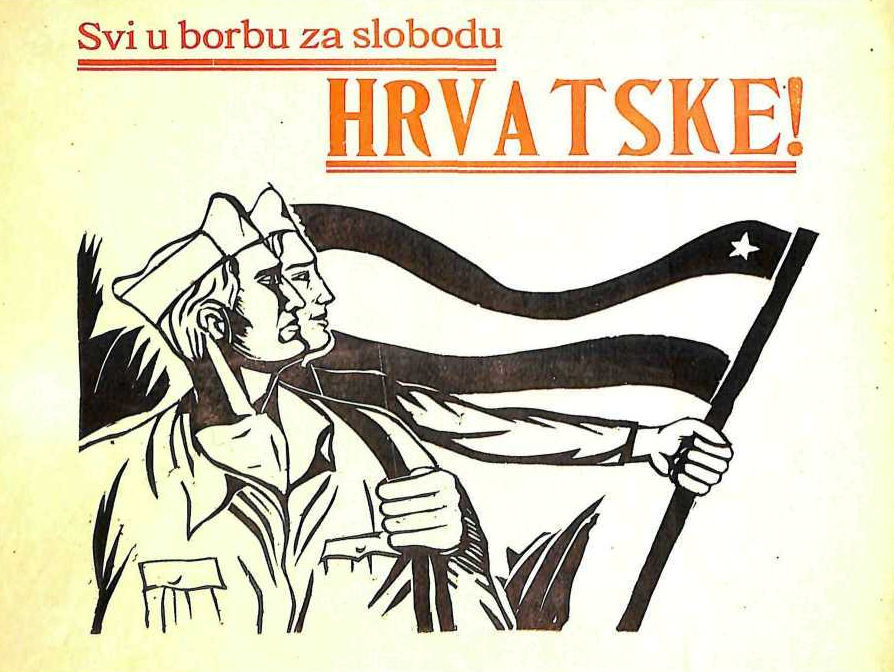
"All in the fight for the freedom of Croatia", Partisan poster from World War II

In the first years of the war, the Yugoslav Partisans in Croatia did not have considerable support from Croats, with an exception of the Croats in the Croatian region of Dalmatia. The majority of partisans on the territory of Croatia were Croatian Serbs. However, in 1943 Croats started to join the partisans in larger numbers. In 1943, the number of Croat partisans in Croatia increased, so in 1944 they made up 61% of the partisans in the territory of Independent State of Croatia, while Serbs made up 28%; all other ethnicities made up the remaining 11%.

On 13 June 1943 in Otočac, Lika, Croatian partisans founded the ZAVNOH (National Anti-Fascist Council of the People's Liberation of Croatia), a legislative body of the future Croatian republic within Yugoslavia. Its first president was Vladimir Nazor. Croatian partisans had autonomy along with the Slovene and Macedonian partisans. However, on 1 March 1945 they were put under the command of the Supreme Command of the Yugoslav Army, thus losing their autonomy. Partisans of Serbia and Bosnia and Herzegovina did not have such autonomy.

Because of partisan victories and increased territory held by partisans, AVNOJ decided to hold the second session in Jajce at the end of November 1943. At that session, the Yugoslav communist leadership decided to reestablish Yugoslavia as federal state.

=== Creation ===
On 29 November 1945, the Yugoslav Constituent Assembly held a session where it was decided that Croatia would be joined by five other republics in Yugoslavia: Slovenia, Bosnia and Herzegovina, Montenegro, Serbia and Macedonia. Not long after, the Communist Party started to prosecute those who opposed the communist one-party system. On 30 January 1946, the Constituent Assembly ratified the Constitution of the Federal People's Republic of Yugoslavia. Croatia was the last of the republics to make its own constitution, which was mostly the same as the federal and other republic constitutions. The Constitution of the People's Republic of Croatia was adopted by the Constituent Parliament of the People's Republic of Croatia on 18 January 1947. In their constitutions, all republics were deprived of gaining independence.

Republics had only formal autonomy; initially, communist Yugoslavia was a highly centralized state, based on the Soviet model. The Communist Party's officials were, at the same time, state officials, while the Party's Central Committee was de jure, the highest organ of the party; however, main decisions were made by the Politburo. The governments of the republics were only part of the mechanism which executed the Politburo's decisions.

=== Election ===
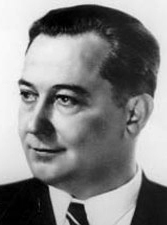
Ivan Šubašić, Prime Minister of Yugoslavia in exile and prominent member of the Croatian Peasant Party

In post-war Yugoslavia, communists had a struggle for power with the opposition that supported King Peter. Milan Grol was the leader of the opposition; as the leading figure of the opposition he opposed the idea of a federal state, denied the right for Montenegrins and Macedonians to have their republics, and held that an agreement between Tito and Ivan Šubašić guaranteed that the opposition needed to have half of the ministers in the new government. The Croatian Peasant Party (HSS), part of the opposition, had divided into three branches: one supporting the Ustaše, the other supporting the communists and the third supporting Vladko Maček. However, communists had the majority in parliament and control over the army, leaving the opposition without any real power. Šubašić had his own supporters within the HSS and he tried to unite the party once again, believing that, once united, it would be a major political factor in the country. The Croatian Republican Peasant Party, a party split from the HSS, wanted to enter the People's Front, a suprapolitical organization controlled by the Communist Party of Yugoslavia. Šubašić knew that this would put the HSS under control of the communists and ended the negotiations about unification.

In the election campaign, the opposition parties wanted to unite with the Serbian Radical Party and other parties; however, communist activities, using various wiles, ruined their plan. On 20 August 1945, Grol resigned and accused the communists of breaking the Tito–Šubašić agreement. Šubašić himself was also soon forced to resign at the end of October as he also disassociated himself from Tito. Soon, the communists won the election. They won an absolute majority in the parliament which enabled them to create their own form of Yugoslavia.

== Politics and government ==
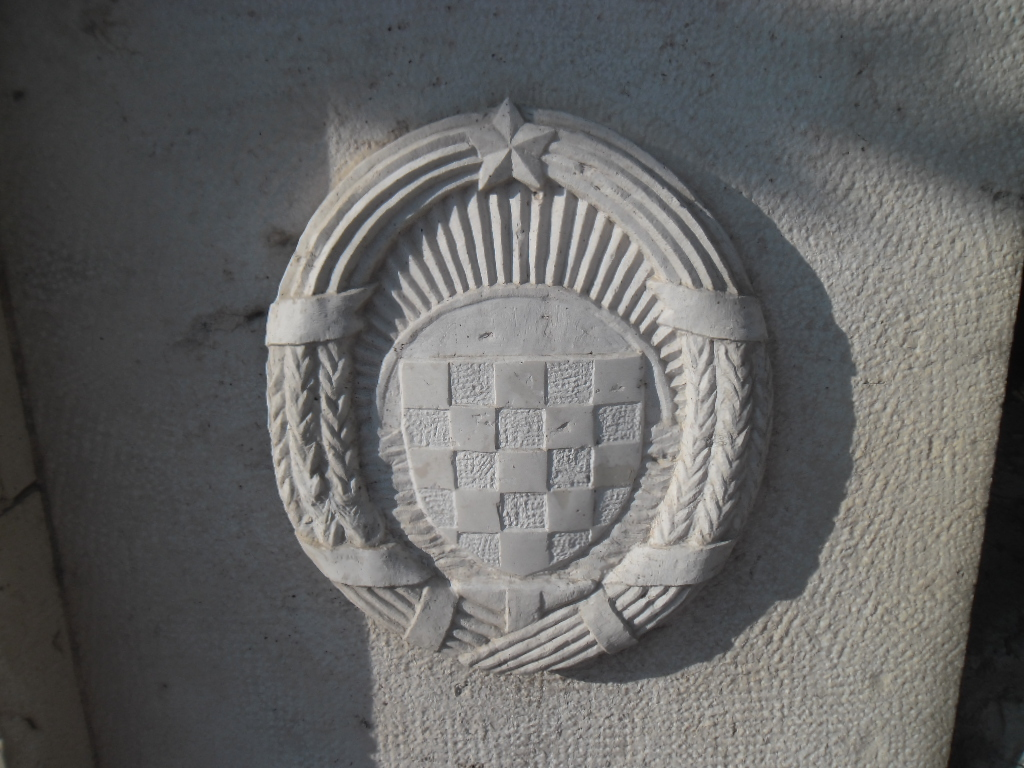
Coat of arms SR Croatia

The People's Republic of Croatia adopted its first Constitution in 1947. In 1953 followed "The Constitutional Law on the Basics of Social and Political Organization and on Republican Organs of Authority", actually a completely new constitution. The second (technically third) Constitution was adopted in 1963; it changed the name of the People's Republic of Croatia (NRH) into the Socialist Republic of Croatia (SRH). Major constitutional amendments were approved in 1971, and in 1974 followed a new Constitution of the SR Croatia which emphasized Croatian statehood as a constituent republic of the SFRY. All the constitutions and amendments were adopted by the Parliament of Croatia (Croatian: Sabor). After the first multi-party parliamentary elections held in April 1990, the Parliament made various constitutional changes and dropped the prefix "socialist" from the official name, so the "Socialist Republic of Croatia" became simply the "Republic of Croatia" (RH). On 22 December 1990, the Parliament rejected the communist one-party system and adopted a liberal democracy through the Constitution of Croatia. It was under this Constitution that independence would be proclaimed on 25 June 1991 (after the Croatian independence referendum held on 19 May 1991).

According to the Art. 1.2 of the 1974 Croatian Constitution, the Socialist Republic of Croatia was defined as "a national state of the Croatian people, the state of the Serbian people in Croatia and the state of other nationalities living in it".

Period	Government branches			
1947–1953	Organs of state authority		Organs of state administration	
1947–1953	Parliament	Presidium of the Parliament	Government	
1953–1971	Parliament		Executive Council	Republic Administration
1971–1974	Parliament	Presidency of the Parliament	Executive Council	Republic Administration
1974–1990	Parliament	Presidency of the Republic	Executive Council	Republic Administration
1990–1991	Parliament	President		Government

=== Tito period ===
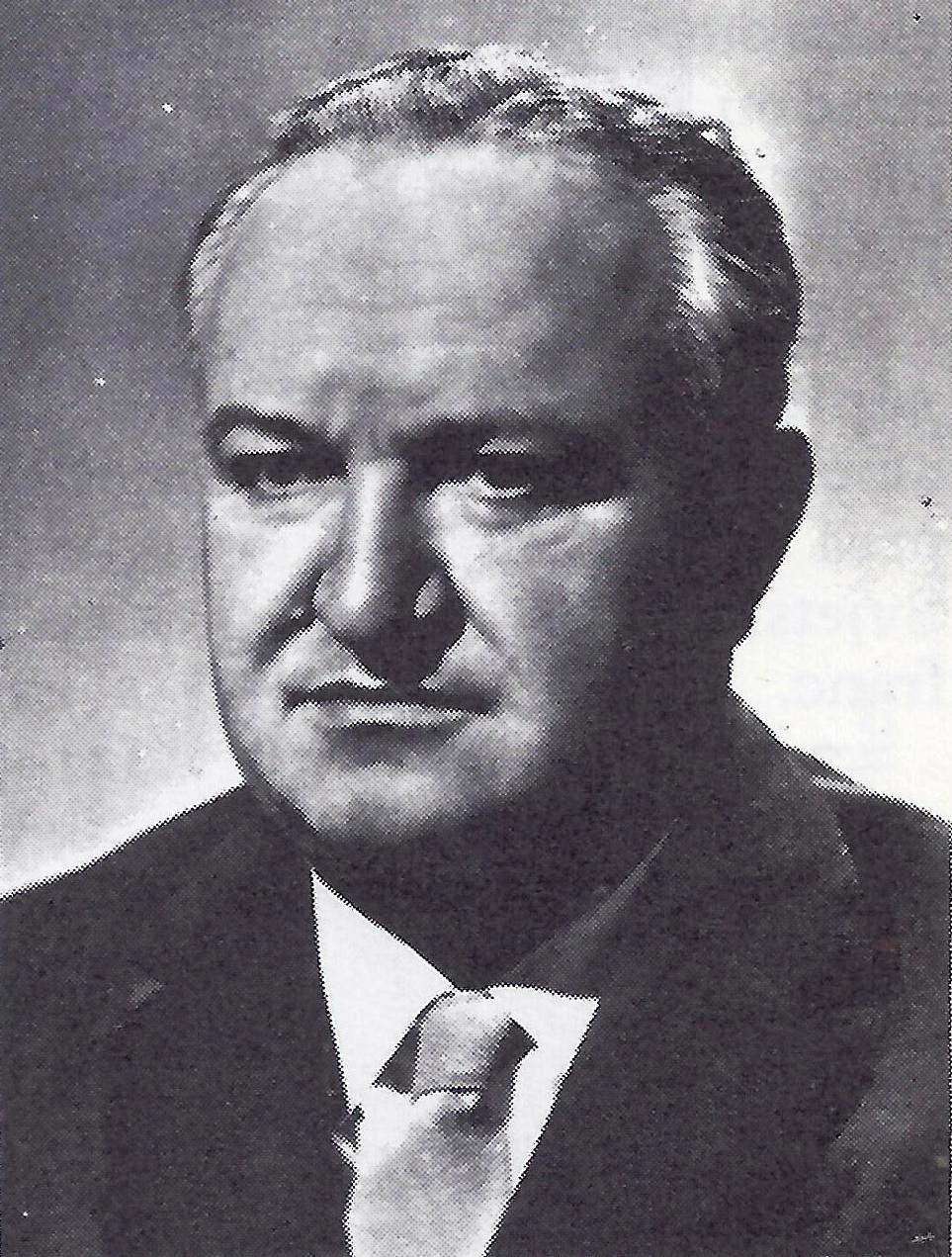
Vladimir Bakarić, the first head of government of the SR Croatia

The first post-war head of state of the Socialist Republic of Croatia was Vladimir Nazor (actually President of the Presidium of the Parliament of the People's Republic of Croatia), who was, during the war, Chairman of the State Antifascist Council of the People's Liberation of Croatia (ZAVNOH), while the first head of government was Vladimir Bakarić. Ironically, even though communists promoted federalism, post-war Yugoslavia was strictly centralized. The main organ was the Politburo of the Central Committee of the Communist Party of Croatia (from 1952 the League of Communists of Croatia) made of around ten persons. Its members were assigned to certain fields: one controlled the armed forces, another the development of the state, a third the economy etc. Ostensibly, the system of government was representative democracy: people would elect councillors and members of parliaments. However, the real power was in the hands of executive organs. Representative organs (the Parliament and various councils on local and district levels) only served to give legitimacy to their decisions. The party that ruled the SR Croatia was the branch of the Communist Party of Yugoslavia, the Communist Party of Croatia (KPH). Even though the party had a Croatian name, its membership was only 57% Croats, along with 43% Serb. The majority of members were peasants and the majority was half-educated.

Soon after they gained power, the Communists started to persecute former officials of the Independent State of Croatia in order to compromise them to the general public. On 6 June 1946, the Supreme Court of the SR Croatia sentenced some of the leading officials of the NDH, including Slavko Kvaternik, Vladimir Košak, Miroslav Navratil, Ivan Perčević, Mehmed Alajbegović, Osman Kulenović and others. Communists also had a number of major and minor show trials in order to deal with the fascist regime of the NDH. Also, local leaders of the civic parties would often "disappear" without any witness. Communists not only cleansed the officials who were working for the NDH, but also those who supported the Croatian Peasant Party and the Catholic Church.

The only major civic party in Croatia, the Croatian Republican Peasant Party, was active only a few years after the election, but as a satellite of the Communist Party. The clash with the civic anti-communist forces stimulated the Communist Party's centralism and authoritarianism.

When he took power, Tito knew that the greatest threat to the development of communism in Yugoslavia was nationalism. Because of that, the communists would crush even the slightest form of nationalism by repression. The communists made the most effort to crush nationalism in Bosnia and Herzegovina and Croatia and tried to suppress the hatred between Croats, Serbs and Muslims, but even so, their greatest supporters in this process were local Serbs. Soon, the Serbs were overrepresented in the Croatian and Bosnian state and party leadership.

=== After Tito's death ===
In 1980, Josip Broz Tito died. Political and economic difficulties started to mount and the federal government began to crumble. The federal government realised that it was unable to service the interest on its loans and started negotiations with the IMF that continued for years. Public polemics in Croatia concerning the need to help poor and less developed regions became more frequent, as Croatia and Slovenia contributed about 60 percent of those funds. The debt crisis, together with soaring inflation, forced the federal government to introduce measures such as the foreign currency law for earnings of export firms. Ante Marković, a Bosnian Croat who at the time was the Croatian head of government, said that Croatia would lose around $800 million because of that law. Marković became the last head of government of Yugoslavia in 1989 and spent two years implementing various economic and political reforms. His government's efforts were initially successful, but ultimately failed due to the incurable political instability of the SFRY.

Ethnic tensions were on the increase and would result in the demise of Yugoslavia. The growing crisis in Kosovo, the nationalist memorandum of the Serbian Academy of Sciences and Arts, the emergence of Slobodan Milošević as the leader of Serbia, and everything else that followed provoked a very negative reaction in Croatia. The fifty-year-old rift was starting to resurface, and the Croats increasingly began to show their own national feelings and express opposition towards the Belgrade regime.

On 17 October 1989, the rock group Prljavo kazalište held a major concert before almost 250,000 people in the central Zagreb city square. In light of the changing political circumstances, their song "Mojoj majci" ("To my mother"), where the songwriter hailed the mother in the song as "the last rose of Croatia", was taken to heart by the fans on the location and many more elsewhere because of the expressed patriotism. On October 26, parliament declared All Saints Day (November 1) a public holiday.

In January 1990, during the 14th Congress of the League of Communists of Yugoslavia, the delegation of Serbia led by Milošević insisted on replacing the 1974 constitutional policy that empowered the republics with a policy of "one person, one vote", which would benefit the majority Serb population. This caused first the Slovenian and then Croatian delegations (led by Milan Kučan and Ivica Račan, respectively) to leave the Congress in protest and marked a culmination in the rift of the ruling party.

Ethnic Serbs, who constituted 12% of the population of Croatia, rejected the notion of separation from Yugoslavia. Serb politicians feared the loss of influence they previously had through their membership of the League of Communists in Croatia (that some Croats claimed was disproportionate). Memories from the Second World War were evoked by the rhetoric coming from the Belgrade administration. As Milošević and his clique rode the wave of Serbian nationalism across Yugoslavia, talking about battles to be fought for Serbdom, emerging Croatian leader Franjo Tuđman reciprocated with talk about making Croatia a nation state. The availability of mass media allowed for propaganda to be spread fast and spark jingoism and fear, creating a war climate.

In February 1990, SR Croatia changed its constitutional system to a multi-party system.

In March 1991, the Yugoslav People's Army met with the Presidency of Yugoslavia (an eight-member council composed of representatives from six republics and two autonomous provinces) in an attempt to get them to declare a state of emergency which would allow for the army to take control of the country. Serbian and Serb-dominated representatives (Montenegro, Vojvodina and Kosovo) already in agreement with the army, voted for the proposal, but as representatives of Croatia, Slovenia, Macedonia and Bosnia voted against, the plot failed. The dying country had yet to see a few more Serb leadership's attempts to push the plan for centralizing the power in Belgrade, but because of resistance in all other republics, the crisis only deteriorated.

=== Transition to independence ===
The 1990 Croatian parliamentary election was held on 22 April and 6 May 1990. After the first multi-party elections, the creation of a constituent republic based on democratic institutions occurred.

After the first free elections, in July 1990, the prefix "socialist" was dropped, and thereafter Croatia was named the Republic of Croatia.

Franjo Tuđman was elected president and his government embarked on a path toward the independence of Croatia.

== Economy ==
=== Economic model and theory ===
The economy of the SFR Yugoslavia and thus of the Socialist Republic of Croatia was initially influenced by the Soviet Union. As the Communist Party of Yugoslavia was a member of the Communist International, Yugoslav communists thought that the Soviet way to socialism was the only option to create a socialist state. In the early years of the SFR Yugoslavia, Communist members suppressed critics towards the Soviet Union and harbored sympathies towards it.

In the CPY, it was generally thought that state ownership and centralism were the only ways to avoid economic breakdown and that without the state ownership and administrative control it would be impossible to accumulate vast resources, material and human, for economic development. Since every undeveloped country needs vast resources in order to start developing, and Yugoslavia was among them, communists thought that this was the only way to save the economy of Yugoslavia. Also, their ideology included elimination of the private sector, as they thought that such an economic system was historically wasteful.

=== Economy during the war ===
The first process of nationalization started on 24 November 1944, when Yugoslav Partisans dispossessed their enemies of their assets. The first victims of the confiscation were occupiers and war criminals. However, not long after, the assets of 199,541 Germans, the whole German minority, including 68,781 ha of land, were confiscated as well. Until the end of the war, the state controlled 55% of industry, 70% of mining, 90% of ferrous metallurgy and 100% of the oil industry.

=== Renewal of the economy ===
In the SR Croatia, material damage and losses were high. In the war, the SR Croatia lost 298,000 people, 7.8% of its total population. Because of the 4-year partisan war, bombings, over-exploitation of raw materials and agricultural resources, and destruction of roads and industrial facilities, the state entered into economic chaos. The peasantry that provided goods to all the conflicting sides in the war was devastated and human losses were also high. The damage to industry in Yugoslavia was the worst in Europe, while the SR Croatia was among the most damaged republics of Yugoslavia, along with Bosnia and Herzegovina and Montenegro. The communist authority needed to act in order to prevent hunger, disorder and chaos. Yugoslavia lacked qualified workers, so the economy's renewal was mostly based on mass volunteer work. The recruitment for volunteer work was conducted with propaganda promising a better communist future, especially for members of Yugoslav partisans and youth. Another segment of these labourers were those who feared persecution, mainly opponents of the communist regime and Nazi collaborators. They entered volunteer labour in order to escape persecution. A third segment of the work force consisted of prisoners of war, who worked the hardest jobs.

The distribution of food and material needed for industry depended on quick rebuilding of damaged roads. The Zagreb-Belgrade railway had been in reconstruction day and night, so the first train to travel this railway after the war, did it by the end of June 1945. Minefields also had to be cleared.

Even though relations between the Western countries and Yugoslavia were tense, significant help to the people of Yugoslavia came from the UNRRA, an American aid agency formed as a branch of the United Nations. They distributed food, clothes and shoes, which helped the country avoid mass starvation. Between 1945 and 1946, the UNRRA deployed 2.5 million tons of goods, mostly food, worth US$415 million. This amount was equal to twice the imports of the Kingdom of Yugoslavia in 1938, or 135% of its tax revenues. It is generally thought that UNRRA fed and clothed some 5 million people.

=== Agrarian reform ===
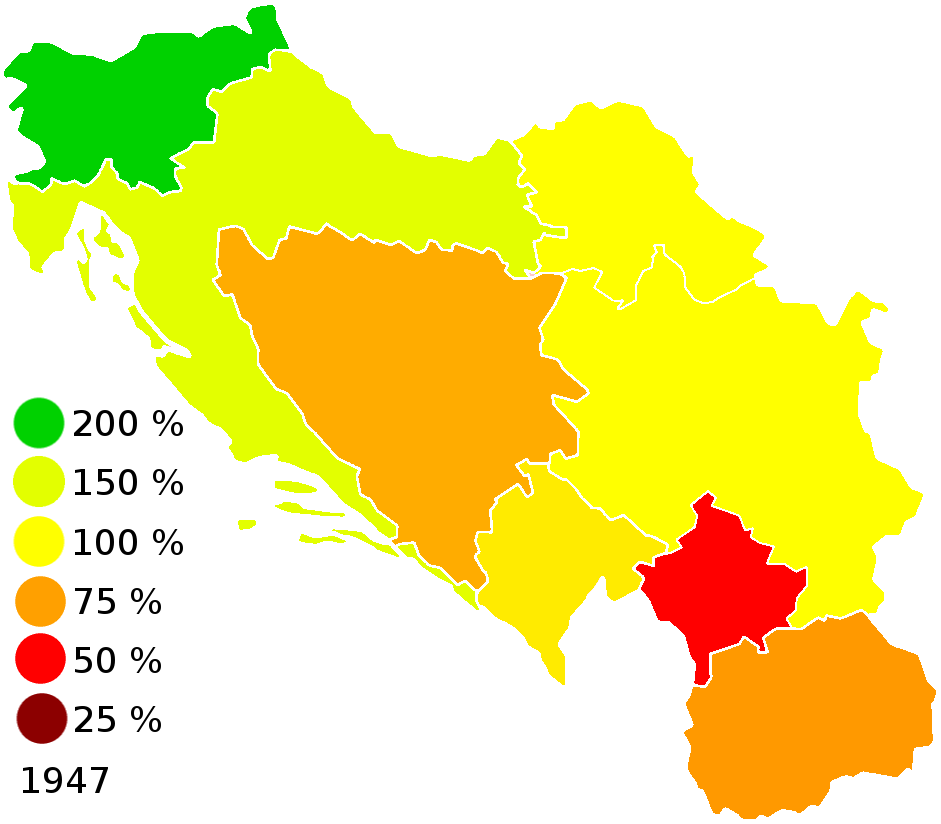
Map showing the economic development of the Yugoslav republics in 1947 as a deviation from the mean (Yugoslavia = 100 %).

At the same time as the persecution of political enemies, communist authorities conducted the Agrarian Reform, a reform made on 23 August 1945. This process included dispossession of wealthy citizens and peasants. Agrarian Reform changed the ownership relations of agricultural properties. Land that was above 35 acres was taken from its owners. Nearly half of taken lands were transformed to agricultural areas (state property), while the other half was given to poor peasants. This reform also included the colonization in the SR Croatia where people from the so-called depressed areas moved to areas from which the Volksdeutsche had been expelled. In the SR Croatia, colonization occurred in Slavonia, while colonists were the poor peasants, mostly Croatian and Bosnian Serbs. The confiscation of property was also conducted; people who were trading during the war were declared war profiteers and by this, the state gained factories, banks and large shops.

The communists also introduced a new way of distribution of agricultural products. In order to supply the people who lived in towns and cities, they introduced the redemption of those products. The policy of distribution was based on the idea that the working segment of society should have an advantage in quantity and diversity of goods over the non-working, parasitic segment. This led to development of black markets and speculation.

The next step in the implementation of the Agrarian Reform was nationalization of the large assets of the bourgeoise. On 28 April 1948, when small shops and the majority of crafts had been nationalized, the private sector in the SR Croatia was liquidated to the end; out of 5,395 private shops, only 5 remained active. This decision was a double-edged sword: while the poor segment of society was satisfied by it, the large majority of the population was resistant and ready to revolt. Just like in the Soviet Union, the state controlled the entire economy, while free trade was forbidden in favour of central planning. Because of this, the state started rational distribution of necessities for living, which were distributed among the population based on remittances, while consumers gained a certain amount of certificates each month for buying a certain amount of certain goods, including food, clothes and shoes.

In the spring of 1949, the state introduced high taxes on private farmer's economies which farmers were unable to pay. This forced them to enter into the peasant labour unions, formed based on the Soviet kolhozes. In such a manner, the state introduced forced collectivization of villages. This collectivization soon disappointed the poor peasants who got their land for free in the process of dispossession of wealthy peasants. Even though the communists thought that collectivization would solve the problem with food, on the contrary, the collectivization created the so-called "Bread Crisis" in 1949. The process of dispossession in Yugoslavia lasted from the middle of 1945 until the end of 1949. It was the fastest process of dispossession, even compared to East European communist states.

For this process, the state needed a large number of officials who were members of the Communist Party, receiving orders from the Politburo, thus leaving the Yugoslav republic without any power in the economy. The economy of one republic was depending on decisions made by the Politburo in Belgrade, thus Yugoslavia become a strictly centralized state. Moreover, the liquidation of the private sector, cleansing of the state apparatus and high officials and their replacement by half-educated partisans, drastic reduction of the gap between payments of ministers and workers (3:1), and emigration and deaths of the bourgeois class led to the disappearance of the middle class in the social structure, which had a negative effect on social life.

=== Industrialization ===
==== Five-Year Plan ====
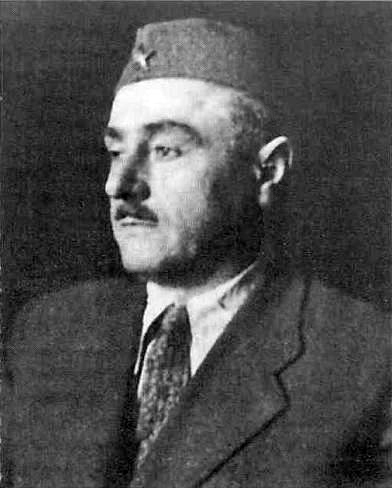
Andrija Hebrang, 4th Secretary of the Communist Party of Croatia, a creator of the Five-Year Plan

Industrialization was the most significant process in the economic development of the SR Croatia, as communists promoted industrialization as the main factor in fast development. After the process of renewal, the process of industrialization and electrification started based on the Soviet model. The whole economy, the creation of a system and the formulation of the strategy of development in the Five-Year Plan, was in the charge of Andrija Hebrang. As President of the Economy Council and President of the Planning Commission, Hebrang was in charge of all ministries that dealt with the economy. Alongside Tito, Edvard Kardelj and Aleksandar Ranković, he was the most influential person in Yugoslavia. As a chief of the whole economy, Hebrang finished his Five-Year Plan in winter 1946–47 which was approved by the government in spring 1947. Because of the lack of knowledge, the Plan copied the Soviet model. The factories which were built faster were factories that were in the sector of heavy and military industry, of which the most known in SR Croatia were "Rade Končar" and "Prvomajska".

In the Five-Year Plan, Hebrang wanted to increase the industrial production by five times and agricultural production by 1.5 times, increase the GDP per capita by 1.8 times and the national revenues by 1.8 times. The plan also included the increase of qualified workers, from 350,000 to 750,000. For the SR Croatia, it was decided that its industrial production needed to be increased by 452%. The fast development in industry required a high number of workers, so from 461,000 workers in 1945, in 1949 there were 1,990,000 workers. On 17 January 1947, Kardelj stated to the Central Committee of the Communist Party of Croatia that Yugoslavia would be industrially stronger than Austria and Czechoslovakia. Both Kardelj and Bakarić advocated development of light industry, instead of Hebrang's idea for industry that would serve agriculture. The Five-Year Plan was indeed exaggerated; this plan did not have qualified personnel, market (placement) and capital; even so, the state continued with its implementation.

All across the country, the state built the sites, and all projects of industrialization and electrification were made with propaganda that the population would have lower poverty and unemployment. The unemployment was indeed reduced, however, new employees were not educated for their jobs, so many objects were built slowly and many of them were not built at all. Following the current views of the Communist Party, the role of leading the economy was given to the directorate-generals, as a link between the ministries and the Party's leadership. By their implementation, the state gained even greater control over the economy. The companies had their legal person; however, they did not have operational autonomy, since they were, as state organs, under state control.

== Religion ==
The majority of residents were Roman Catholics and approximately 12% of the population were Orthodox Christians of the Serbian Patriarchy, with a small number of other religions. Due to strained relationships between the Holy See and communist Yugoslav officials, no new Catholic bishops were appointed in the People's Republic of Croatia until 1960. This left the dioceses of Križevci, Đakovo-Osijek, Zadar, Šibenik, Split-Makarska, Dubrovnik, Rijeka and Poreč-Pula without bishops for several years. From the mid-1950s, there were only four seated bishops in Croatia in three dioceses: Aloysius Stepinac, Franjo Salis-Seewiss, Mihovil Pušić, and Josip Srebrnič.

Many priests accused of collaboration with the Ustaše and Axis during World War II were arrested after the end of World War II amid conflicts between the Catholic Church and the Allied Powers, including the Archbishop of Zagreb, Aloysius Stepinac. Aloysius Stepinac was arrested on 16 September 1946. He was sentenced to sixteen years' imprisonment, but in December 1951, he was released to house arrest at his home in Krašić near Jastrebarsko, where he died in 1960. Stepinac was made a cardinal in 1953 by Pope Pious XII.

== Symbols ==
Flag used during World War II and early post-war period (1943–47)

Emblem used during World War II and early post-war period (1943–47)

Flag of SR Croatia (1945–1990)

Emblem of SR Croatia (1947–1990)

Flag used in 1990, before adoption of the current national flag

Coat of arms used in 1990, before adoption of the current coat of arms

Flag used by Croatia (1990–1991), still used today by Republic of Croatia (1991–present)

Coat of arms used by Croatia (1990–1991), still used today by Republic of Croatia (1991–present)

== See also ==
- Croatia
- History of Croatia
- Timeline of Croatian history

== Sources ==
- Tanner, Marcus (2001). Croatia : a nation forged in war (2nd ed.). New Haven; London: Yale University Press. ISBN 0-300-09125-7.
- Goldstein, Ivo (1999). Croatia: A History. London: C. Hurst & Co. Publishers. ISBN 1-85065-525-1.
- Matković, Hrvoje (2003). Povijest Jugoslavije: (1918–1991–2003). Zagreb: Naklada P.I.P. Pavičić. ISBN 953-6308-46-0.
- Bilandžić, Dušan (1999). Hrvatska moderna povijest (in Croatian). Golden marketing. ISBN 953-6168-50-2.
