= Open Letter on the Position and Status of Serbs in Croatia =

The Open Letter on the Position and Status of Serbs in Croatia was sent to the addresses of prominent Croatians and Serbians in September 2008. The letter spoke about the adverse social and economic circumstances in which Croatian Serbs had lived.

== Content of the letter ==
The letter was a result of extensive studies about respect for minority rights in Croatia, which were initiated by the Serb Democratic Forum and other partner NGOs of the Forum, like UNHCR, University of Zagreb and other Serbian NGOs.

The study drew attention to problems such as long-term trials, verbal insults, physical attacks, and the devastation of buildings and religious objects belonging to the Serbian minority. Some media, such as Jutarnji list, published criticisms of the implementation of the Erdut Agreement. The study found that Nova TV and Večernji list are at the forefront of hate speech in the media. The study also addressed the phenomenon of nationalist singer Marko Perković.

According to the study, Serbs in Croatia are marginalized, their ethnic identity is stigmatized, and the blame is placed on them for the Independence War. It highlighted that the regions where Serbs have lived for centuries have been devastated and economically neglected.

The letter said that there have been some developments in human and minority rights, but it warned of a lack of implementation of good legislation. The letter noted that Serbs in Croatia still do not have equal opportunities for socialization or the same level of human rights, ethnic or professional recognition, particularly in areas where they have returned to live recently. The letter stated that for positive change to occur it would be necessary for the majority population to perceive the minority population as having a richness of living environment and not as presenting a threat to society.

== Reactions ==
The Serb Democratic Forum did not invite the Independent Democratic Serb Party to sign the open letter, taking the view that, as part of the government, they hold some responsibility for the marginalization of the Serbian minority. This subsequently led to clashes between the Serb Democratic Forum, the Independent Democratic Serb Party and the Party of Danube Serbs.

== Prominent signatories ==
- Ivo Banac (historian, professor, president of Croatian Helsinki Committee (2007–09) and member of the Croatian Academy of Sciences and Arts)
- Sead Berberović (University of Zagreb professor)
- Alen Budaj (director of the Margelov Institut)
- Slobodan Budak (lawyer)
- Ivan Zvonimir Čičak (Croatian politician and first president of the Croatian Helsinki Committee)
- Silvije Degen (lawyer and politician from Zagreb)
- Zora Dirnbach (member of the Croatian Writers' Society)
- Srđan Dvornik (writer, who was active in the work of the Open Society Institute and the Heinrich Böll Foundation)
- Davor Gjenero (independent political consultant)
- Drago Hedl (investigative journalist)
- Salomon Jazbec (member of the Religions for Peace and secretary of The Margel Institute)
- Boris Jurinić (member of the Council for Development of Civil Society of the Croatian Government in the Ministry of Culture
- Petar Kuzmić (President of the Evangelical (Pentecostal) Church in the Republic of Croatia)
- Dražen Lalić (sociologist and professor at the University of Zagreb)
- Svetozar Livada (President of the Union of Serbs in Croatia)
- Predrag Matvejević (writer)
- Jovan Mirić (professor at the University of Zagreb)
- Aleksandar Novković (photographer)
- Jaroslav Pecnik (political analyst)
- Drago Pilsel (columnist and former member of Amnesty International)
- Žarko Puhovski (professor, political analyst and former president of the Croatian Helsinki Committee)
- Simo Rajić (lawyer and former MP of the Croatian Parliament)
- Slobodan Šnajder (writer)
- Lordan Zafranović (Yugoslavian film director and a major figure of the Yugoslav Black Wave)
- Zdravko Zima (literary critic, essayist and columnist)
- Daniel Žderić (owner of the largest publishing house in Croatia, Profil)
