= Hrvatska ljevica (magazine) =

Defunct Croatian newspaper

- Editor: Stipe Šuvar
- Categories: Political magazine
- Frequency: Monthly
- Founded: 1994
- Final issue: 2005
- Company: Razlog d.o.o.
- Country: Croatia
- Based in: Zagreb
- Language: Croatian

Hrvatska ljevica (English: Croatian Left) was a left-wing monthly magazine in Croatia issued from 1994 to 2005. It was published by the independent publishing house Razlog. It was discontinued following the death of its main editor and owner, Stipe Šuvar, the former Minister of Culture and Vice President of Yugoslavia. The magazine was also edited by Filip Erceg, Mladen Jakopović (pseudonym Daniel Jakopovich), Bojan Mirosavljev and Jasna Tkalec. Most of the living editors of Hrvatska ljevica became editors of the left-wing journal Novi Plamen.

Notable contributors to Hrvatska ljevica included the Vice-President of the International PEN Club Professor Predrag Matvejević, the Professor Branko Horvat (a Nominee for the Nobel Prize in Economy), the Professor Milan Kangrga, the Professor Rastko Močnik, Professor Boris Buden, Professor Nikola Visković, Professor Veselin Golubović, Dr Dejan Jović and the Professor Ivan Kuvačić. The magazine had a leading role in bringing to light the war crimes committed in and around the city of Sisak during the Croatian War of Independence. The magazine was charged and convicted of libel against a military official who was in charge of Sisak's defence at the time. The fine was 50,000 kunas.
