= Andrea Feldman (historian) =

Croatian historian (born 1960)

- Born: 22 October 1960 (age 65); Zagreb, PR Croatia, Yugoslavia
- Education: University of Zagreb; Yale University
- Occupation: Historian
- Political party: Liberal Party (1998–2006); Sustainable Development of Croatia (2013–2014)
- Spouse: Ivo Banac (m. 2010; died 2020)

Andrea Feldman (born 22 October 1960) is a Croatian historian and liberal politician.

== Early life and education ==
She was born in Zagreb. After finishing elementary and high school in her hometown, she enrolled at the Zagreb Faculty of Humanities and Social Sciences from which she graduated in history. She attended postgraduation studies at the Yale University where she obtained M.A. and M.Phil. degrees. In December 2009, Feldman obtained her Ph.D. from the Yale University with the doctoral thesis - "Imbro I. Tkalac and Liberalism in Croatia".

== Career ==
=== Professional/research work ===
Feldman participated at many international conferences in Croatia, US, Italy, Austria, Hungary, Bosnia and Herzegovina, Bulgaria, Germany, Spain, the Netherlands, UK, Poland, Turkey, Slovakia, Belgium and Italy. During her stay in the US, she regularly participated in the work of the Association for Slavic, East European, and Eurasian Studies. She is Croatian representative at the International Federation for Research in Women's History since 1989.

Between 1987 and 1988, she was a researcher and associate at UCL School of Slavonic and East European Studies, and in the fall of 1993 a junior researcher at the Austrian Institut für die Wissenschaften vom Menschen. In 1996, she worked for the Sterling Memorial Library transcribing, translating and cataloging testimonies of Holocaust survivors from Croatia, Serbia and Bosnia and Herzegovina for the Holocaust Archives. Friedman collaborated with the Yale Psychiatric Institute, working as a translator and co-worker on a posttraumatic stress disorder research.

=== University work ===
In 1992, Feldman worked as an assistant at the Department of History at Yale University where she lectured subjects including the History of International Communism. Between 1992 and 1993, she lectured the initial degree of Croatian, Serbian and Bosnian languages at the Department of Slavic Studies at Yale. In the fall semester of 1995, she lectured subject Bosnia and Herzegovina - Evolution of Multicultural Society. In 1996, she became assistant to prof. Mark Steinberg on the subject Russian Culture (1824-1990).

Between 1985 and 2020 Feldman worked at the Croatian Institute of History. In the academic year 2002-03, she lectured subject History of Serbs for students of a special program of Serbian language, history, and culture at the Faculty of Teacher Education of the University of Zagreb. Between 2002 and 2004, she advised Foreign Ministers Tonino Picula and Miomir Žužul on human rights and civil society. In 2004, she was appointed a director of the Open Society Institute - Croatia. She worked at the position until 2006 when she became executive director of the Institute for Democracy. In 2008, she was appointed a deputy director of the Mediterranean Institute for Life Sciences.

As an external associate at the University Department for Croatian Studies of the University of Zagreb, she lectured subject Women/Gender History in the 19th and 20th centuries. She also taught courses in History and Culture of the West (from the French Revolution to the Fall of the Berlin Wall) and the Political and Cultural Formations of the South Slavic Nations at the University of Business Studies in Banja Luka. In the academic year 2010-11, she lectured subject of Comparative Politics at the School of Science and Technology of the University of Sarajevo. In addition, she also lectured at the University of London, University College London and King's College.

Feldman is a member of the Croatian Writers' Society (HDP), and member of the Management Board of the Croatian branch of PEN International.

== Political career ==
Feldman was an active member of the Liberal Party during the time it was governed by her future husband Ivo Banac. She left the party when it was taken over by the associates of Zlatko Kramarić with whose politics she didn't agree. Feldman was politically inactive until 2013 when she joined Mirela Holy in founding Sustainable Development of Croatia party (ORaH). She left the party in 2014 citing disagreement with the political direction of the party, the question of support to Ivo Josipović (with whom she didn't agree) and bad interpersonal relations between members. At the 2014 European Parliament election, she was at the second place on the ORaH's electoral list, and was short a handful of votes to get elected to the European Parliament.

== Private life ==
Feldman married historian Ivo Banac in 2010. She speaks English, German and Italian.

== Works ==
- Liberalna misao u Hrvatskoj. Prilozi povijesti liberalizma od kraja 18. do sredine 20. stoljeća [Liberal Thought in Croatia. Contributions to the History of Liberalism from the late 18th to mid 20th century], Friedrich-Naumann-Stiftung, Zagreb, 2000.
- Žene u Hrvatskoj. Ženska i kulturna povijest [Women in Croatia. Women's and Cultural History], Institut „Vlado Gotovac“, Ženska infoteka, Zagreb, 2004. (prevedena na mađarski "A. Feldman, Szerkesztette. (2008.): A nők Horvátországban: Nőtörténelem és női művelődés, Balassi Kiadó, Budapest")
- Zov Sirakuze ili zašto sam u politici [Cry of Sirakuze or Why I'm in Politics], Ženska infoteka, Zagreb, 2003.
- Povijesno gledamo. Razgovori s povjesničarima [We look Historically. Interviews with Historians], Izdanja Antibarbarus, Zagreb, 2007.
- Imbro I. Tkalac (1824.-1912.): Europsko iskustvo hrvatskog liberala, Izdanja Antibarbarus, Zagreb, 2012.
