= Stahuljak =

Stahuljak is a surname. Notable people with the surname include:

- Juraj Stahuljak (1901–1975), Croatian composer
- Zrinka Stahuljak (born 1969), Croatian historian
