= Nadežda Čačinovič =

Slovenian philosopher

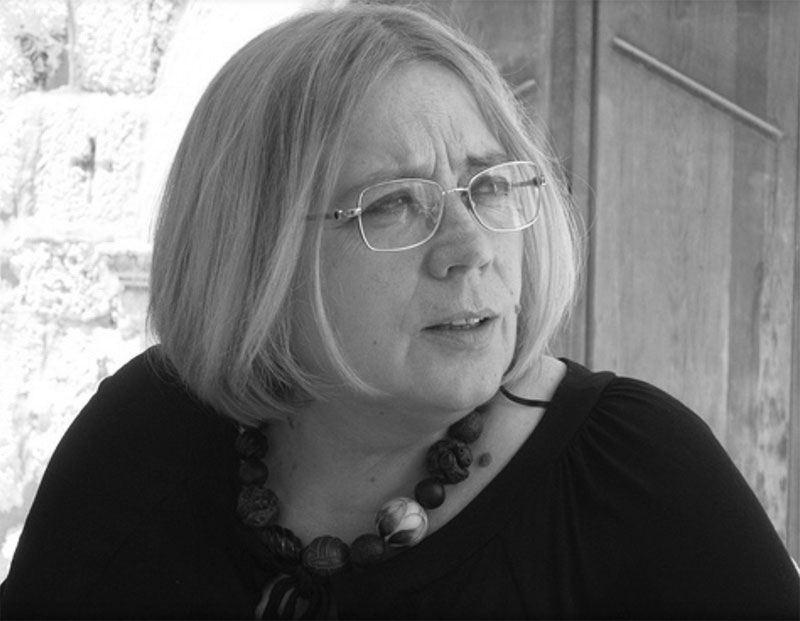
- Čačinovič in 2011
- Born: 1 April 1947 (age 79); Budapest, Hungary
- Spouse(s): Žarko Puhovski (divorced); Ivo Banac (separated)

Philosophical work
- Era: 20th-century philosophy and contemporary philosophy
- Region: Western philosophy
- Main interests: Aesthetics · Critical theory · Feminism
- Website: Info and biography

Nadežda Čačinovič (born 1 April 1947) is a Croatian philosopher, sociologist and author.

== Biography ==
She was born to Slovene parents in Budapest in 1947 where her father Rudolf Čačinovič was serving as a military attache. She graduated in philosophy and comparative literature at the University of Ljubljana. She subsequently studied at the University of Bonn from 1968 to 1970 where her father was serving as ambassador of Yugoslavia to West Germany. She obtained a doctorate and became a professor at the Department of Philosophy of the Faculty of Humanities and Social Sciences at the University of Zagreb, being employed there since 1976.

She is also a member of an advisory board of a left-wing magazine Novi Plamen. Čačinovič was also active in left wing politics, running for parliament for the Social Democratic Action of Croatia.

Since 2009 she has been the president of the Croatian P.E.N. Centre, member of International PEN.

After Andrea Zlatar-Violić became Minister of Culture in the Croatian government, Čačinovič was selected by Zlatar-Violić to take her place in the ministry's Committee for Books, Publication, and Bookselling Activities on 4 July 2012.

In 2017, Čačinovič has signed the Declaration on the Common Language of the Croats, Serbs, Bosniaks and Montenegrins.

== Bibliography ==
- Zašto čitati filozofe. Zagreb, 2009.
- Vodič kroz svjetsku književnost za inteligentnu ženu. Zagreb, 2007.
- Žene i filozofija. Zagreb, 2006.
- Parvulla aesthetica. Zagreb, 2004.
- Danilo Pejović, professor emeritus Facultatis philosophicae Universitatis studiorum Zagrabiensis. Zagreb, 2002.
- U ženskom ključu. Zagreb, 2000.
- Doba slika u teoriji mediologije. Zagreb, 2001.
- Ogled o pismenosti. Zagreb, 1994.
- Estetika. Zagreb, 1988.
- Estetika njemačke romantike. Zagreb, 1987.
- Pisanje i mišljenje. Zagreb 1981.
- Subjekt kritičke teorije. Zagreb, 1980.
