= Božo Biškupić =

Croatian politician and lawyer

Božo Biškupić MSc
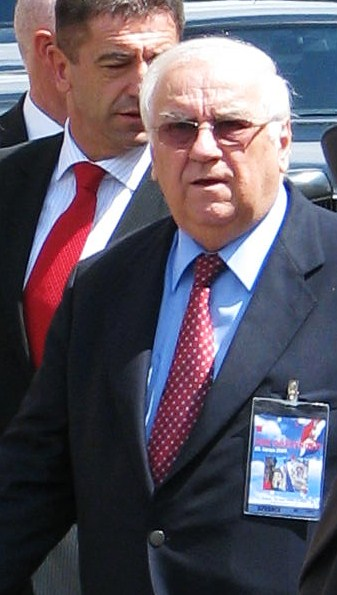

Minister of Culture
- In office 23 December 2003 – 29 December 2010
- Prime Minister: Ivo Sanader (2003–2009); Jadranka Kosor (2003–2009)
- Preceded by: Antun Vujić
- Succeeded by: Jasen Mesić
- In office 7 November 1995 – 27 January 2000
- Prime Minister: Zlatko Mateša
- Preceded by: Zlatko Vitez
- Succeeded by: Antun Vujić

Personal details
- Born: 26 April 1938 (age 88) Mala Mlaka (near Zagreb), Kingdom of Yugoslavia
- Party: Croatian Democratic Union
- Education: University of Zagreb (Faculty of Law)
- Awards: Order of Danica Hrvatska

Božo Biškupić (born 26 April 1938 in Mala Mlaka, near Zagreb) is a Croatian politician and lawyer. He served as Minister of Culture of Croatia in the governments of three Croatian Prime Ministers: Zlatko Mateša (1995–2000), Ivo Sanader (2003–2009) and Jadranka Kosor (2009–2010). Therefore his two non-consecutive ministerial terms (1995–2000 and 2003–2010) amount to a total of 11 years and 87 days, the longest tenure of any minister in a Croatian Government since independence in 1991.

== Overview ==
Biškupić graduated from the University of Zagreb's Faculty of Law, and later earned a master's degree in museology at postgraduate studies of librarian, documentation and information sciences at University of Zagreb's Faculty of Philosophy. From 1974 to 1980 he worked at a law firm based in Zagreb, and he is also notable for editing publications on visual arts published by the National and University Library.

In 1990 Biškupić joined the Croatian Democratic Union party (HDZ) and in 1992 was appointed assistant to the Minister of Culture. From 1993 to 1995 he served as Deputy Mayor of Zagreb. From November 1995 to January 2000 he served his first term as Minister of Culture, under Prime Minister Zlatko Mateša. After his term ended he ran in the parliamentary elections and was elected to the Croatian parliament three times at the 2000, 2003 and 2007 elections. He was appointed Minister of Culture again in December 2003, under Prime Minister Ivo Sanader, and was confirmed to serve a second term in January 2008 after HDZ won the 2007 elections again.

== Personal life ==
Biškupić is married and has a daughter. He speaks English and German and his hobbies include chess and music.
