= Antun Vujić =

Croatian politician (born 1945)

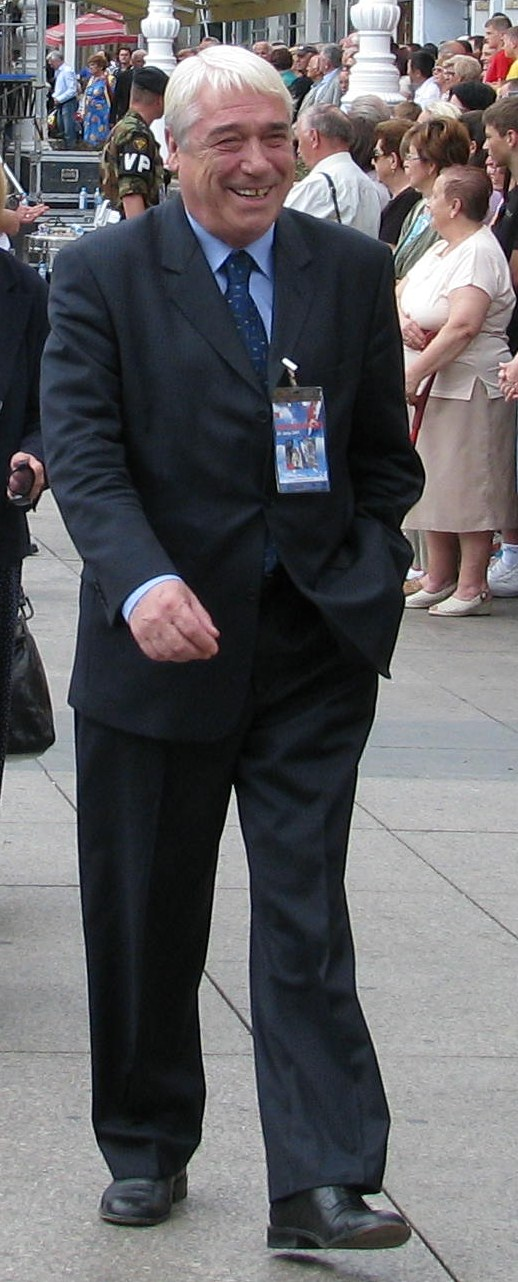

Minister of Culture
- In office 27 January 2000 – 23 December 2003
- Prime Minister: Ivica Račan
- Preceded by: Božo Biškupić
- Succeeded by: Božo Biškupić

Personal details
- Born: 14 July 1945 (age 81) Dubrovnik, SR Croatia, Democratic Federal Yugoslavia (modern Croatia)
- Party: Social Democratic Party (1994-)
- Other political affiliations: Social Democrats of Croatia (1989-1994)
- Education: University of Zagreb (Faculty of Humanities and Social Sciences)

Antun Vujić (born 14 July 1945) is a Croatian politician, philosopher, political analyst, lexicographer and author serving as a director of the Miroslav Krleža Institute of Lexicography since 2012. He was a member of Croatian Parliament and Minister of Culture in the Croatian Government from January 2000 to December 2003.

== Overview ==
Vujić was born in Dubrovnik in 1945. He graduated from the University of Zagreb's Faculty of Humanities and Social Sciences with major in philosophy and sociology. In 1967 he founded Omladinski tjednik, the first Croatian underground magazine. In the post-Croatian Spring purges in 1972 Vujić was branded a "nationalist, liberal and anarcho-syndicalist" and lost his employment, but was recruited by Miroslav Krleža two years later to work in the Yugoslav Lexicographical Institute. In 1985 he earned a Ph.D. degree in philosophy of science.

In 1989 he was one of the founding members of the centre-left political party Social Democrats of Croatia (SDH), and ran at the 1992 presidential elections, coming in 8th with 0.70 percent of the votes. In 1994 SDH merged with the Social Democratic Party of Croatia (SDP), led by Ivica Račan, and Vujić soon became one of SDP's most prominent members. In 1995 he was elected to Croatian Parliament on SDP's list, and was later appointed Minister of Culture when SDP won the 2000 parliamentary elections. After his term ended in December 2003 he was elected to the parliament at the 2003 and 2007 elections.

Vujić contributes articles of political analysis to various magazines, he wrote encyclopedic articles and papers covering philosophy and liberal arts, and he contributed to comprehensive lexicons and encyclopedias. He was the main editor of the first general Croatian Encyclopedia for which he was awarded the State Award for Science in 1998. From 2005 to 2009 he was the editor-in-chief of Proleksis Encyclopedia. Since 2012, he is the director of the Miroslav Krleža Institute of Lexicography. Additionally, he is the director of the social-democratic political academy Novo društvo, and a member of the advisory board of the left-wing magazine Novi Plamen.

== Works ==
- Otvorena znanost i otvoreno društvo (1987) (Open Science and Open Society)
- Otvorena kultura (2003) (Open Culture)
- Hrvatska i ljevica - Prilog socijaldemokratskom gledištu (2014) (Croatia and the Left - A Contribution to the Social Democratic Point of View)- analytical, chronological and autobiographical book that talks about past and future of the social democracy in Croatia
- Dostava rasutog tereta (2016) (Bulk Cargo Delivery, short story collection)
