= Vladimir Ivir =

Vladimir Ivir MVO (November 1, 1934, Zagreb – February 21, 2011, Zagreb) was a Croatian linguist, lexicographer and translation scholar. He was the first Croatian theoretician of translation, highly appreciated among the European linguists.

Ivir's early interest was in English syntax. During his postgraduate research at University College London in 1962/63, under the supervision of Randolph Quirk, he completed a thesis on predicative adjectives. During his time in London, Ivir became interested in the "linguistic revolution" stemming from the ideas of Noam Chomsky, and, upon returning home, became the first Croatian linguist to write an outline of transformational linguistics.

He was the author of many Croatian textbooks for high schools, for learning English, and for secondary school programs for translators. In 2001 his home Faculty has established postgraduate study of Translatorship, based on Ivir's ideas and programs.

He was named Emeritus Professor at the University of Zagreb, Faculty of Humanities and Social Sciences, upon his retirement in 2004.

In Croatia, he became widely known as a person that interpreted many important events live, but is especially remembered for his simultaneous translation of the landing on the Moon in 1969. Ivir was also the official translator at the reception in Banski dvori during US President Richard Nixon's visit to Zagreb in 1970.

== Selected publications ==
- (1982) A contrastive analysis of English adjectives and their Serbo-Croatian correspondents (LCCN 94147360)
- (1991) Languages in Contact and Contrast: Essays in Contact Linguistics (= Trends in Linguistics Studies and Monographs 54), Editor, with Damir Kalogjera (ISBN 978-0899257143)
- (1993) Croatian-English Dictionary of Business & Government (ISBN 978-0785997368)
- (1993) Hrvatsko-engleski poslovno-upravni rječnik (LCCN 94124627)
- (2000) Englesko-hrvatski poslovni rječnik (ed. Višnja Špiljak, Vladimir Ivir), Masmedia, Zagreb, 2000., ISBN 953-157-105-8
- (2007) Vladimir Ivir, Ilirjana Shehu: Hrvatsko-englesko-albanski rječnik poslovno administrativnog nazivlja s albansko-hrvatskim indeksom, Školska knjiga, Zagreb, 2007., ISBN 978-953-0-40233-1
- (2007) Hrvatsko-engleski rječnik poslovno-administrativnog nazivlja, 2007.

== Sources ==
- Jakovina, Tvrtko (1999). "Što je značio Nixonov usklik "Živjela Hrvatska"?" (PDF). Društvena istraživanja (in Croatian). 8 (2–3 (40–41)). Institute of Social Sciences Ivo Pilar: 347–371.
- Kalogjera, Damir (2011). "In memoriam Vladimir Ivir (1934 – 2011)" (PDF). Studia Romanica et Anglica Zagrabiensia. 56. Faculty of Humanities and Social Sciences, University of Zagreb: 275–285.
- Pavlovic, Natasa (2011). "Vladimir Ivir, Croatian linguist and translation scholar, dies at 76". est-translationstudies.org. European Society for Translation Studies.
