= Zlatko Kramarić =

Croatian politician

Mayor of Osijek
- In office May 1990 – May 2005
- Succeeded by: Anto Đapić

Personal details
- Born: 5 February 1956 (age 70) Osijek, SR Croatia, SFR Yugoslavia
- Party: Croatian Social Liberal Party (1990–1997; 2006–present); Liberal Party (1997–2006)

Zlatko Kramarić (born 5 February 1956) is a Croatian liberal politician from Osijek.

Kramarić was born in Osijek and graduated in philology (Macedonian literature) at the Faculty of Humanities and Social Sciences, University of Zagreb. Later he obtained a master's degree and a doctorate from the same faculty.

He entered Croatian politics in 1990, during the first free democratic elections when he was candidate of non-partisan "Osijek List" (Croatian: Lista za Osijek) for Osijek local assembly. With the backing of Croatian Democratic Union (HDZ), he became the first non-Communist mayor of Osijek after 1945.

A year later, Osijek became a battleground in the conflict between Croatian government and local Serbs, backed by Yugoslav People's Army. During those events Kramarić had little power and city became under full control of local HDZ strongman Branimir Glavaš. But Kramarić, with his boyish looks, calm demeanour and a great sense of humour managed to use media spotlight in order to become one of the most charismatic and popular public figures in Croatia. Soon after the hostilities ended, Kramarić described his experience in a book of memoirs. Some of more colourful passages, especially those describing the role of local HDZ officials in the opening stages of conflict, brought him great enmity from government and even public threats against his life.

By that time, Kramarić had joined Croatian Social Liberal Party (HSLS) and quickly became one of its high-ranking-members. In 1993, HSLS easily won the election for Osijek City Council and Kramarić was elected mayor. Under his rule, Osijek became one of few liberal strongholds of Croatia.

In 1997, after a split in HSLS, Kramarić followed Vladimir Gotovac and joined newly formed Liberal Party (LS). In most of Croatia, HSLS quickly got the upper hand over its former dissidents, but not in Osijek, where LS was much stronger than HSLS.

In the 2000 Croatian parliamentary election, Kramarić was elected to the Croatian Parliament on a joint electoral list of LS, HSS and HNS.

In the 2003 Croatian parliamentary election, Kramarić was reelected to Parliament, on a joint electoral list of LS, SDP and LIBRA.

In 2004 Kramarić opposed the merger of LS into Croatian People's Party. Because of that he orchestrated the removal of LS leader Ivo Banac, who was replaced by Kramarić's long-time associate Zlatko Benašić.

In the spring of 2005, Glavaš embraced regionalism and left HDZ, taking few of Sabor representatives with him and making government majority of Ivo Sanader precariously thin. Kramarić immediately volunteered to help Sanader extinguish this threat and offered LS support in Parliament. This didn't reflect very well on local electorate, which abandoned LS in May 2005 local elections. In June 2005 Kramarić's attempts to create broad anti-Glavaš coalition failed when Glavaš sided with Croatian Party of Rights. Glavaš supporters took Osijek-Baranja County while Anto Đapić became mayor of Osijek, thus replacing one of the longest-serving elected officials in recent history of Croatia.

In 2005, Kramarić started merger negotiations with the Croatian Social Liberal Party, and the Liberal Party re-joined HSLS in early 2006. He became the leader of the HSLS parliamentary club. He was not reelected in the 2007 Croatian parliamentary election.

In December 2008, Kramarić became the first ambassador of Croatia to Kosovo. One of his columns published in a local newspaper in 2010 caused a minor incident with the Ministry of Foreign Affairs. From 2011 to 2015 he was the Croatian ambassador to the Republic of Macedonia.

In 2019, Kramarić was bestowed the Zvane Črnja Award for his book Sat hrvatskog, re:vizija prošlih sjećanja..

Kramarić is married and a father of one.

Political offices
Preceded by Dragutin Badurina	Mayor of Osijek; 1990–2005	Succeeded by Anto Đapić
Party political offices
Preceded by Vlado Gotovac	President of the Liberal Party; 2000–2003	Succeeded by Ivo Banac
Diplomatic posts
Preceded by Office established	Ambassador of Croatia to Kosovo; 2008–2010	Succeeded by Zoran Vodopija
Preceded by Ivan Kujundžić	Ambassador of Croatia to Rep. of Macedonia; 2011–2015	Succeeded by Danijela Barišić
