= Zrinka Stahuljak =

Croatian historian

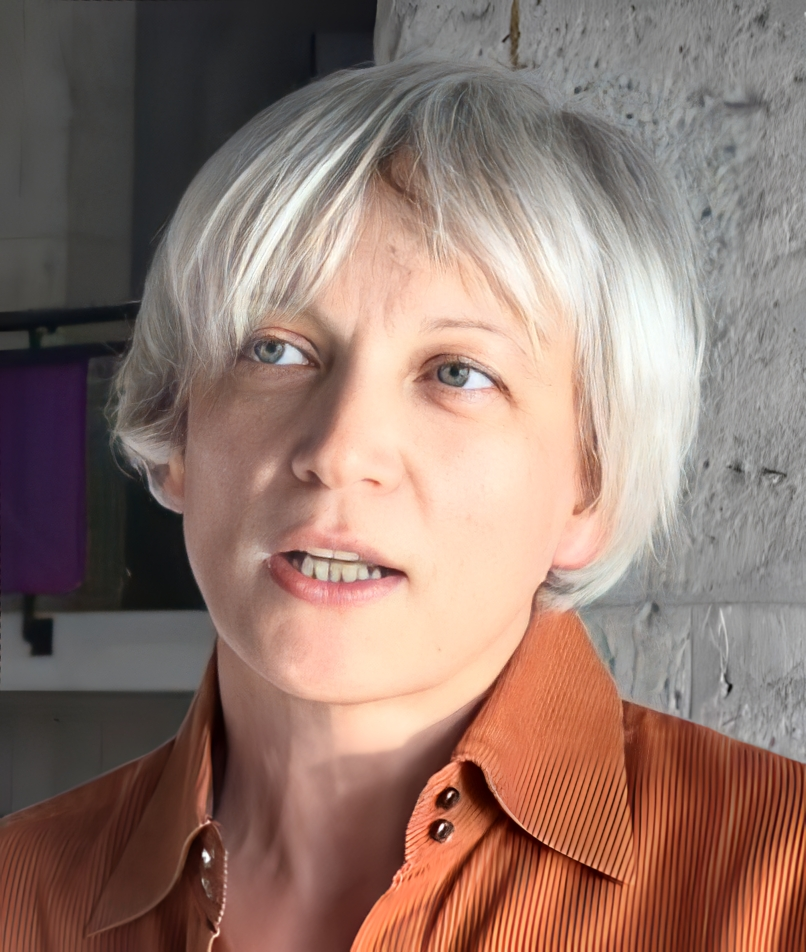
- Stahuljak in 2018
- Born: 27 February 1969 (age 57); Zagreb, Socialist Republic of Croatia, Yugoslavia
- Occupation: Historian
- Awards: Guggenheim Fellowship (2006); Corresponding member of the Croatian Academy of Sciences and Arts (2020)

Academic background
- Education: Faculty of Humanities and Social Sciences, University of Zagreb; University of Kansas; Emory University

Academic work
- Sub-discipline: Old French; medieval literature
- Institutions: Boston University; University of California, Los Angeles

Zrinka Stahuljak (born 27 February 1969) is a Croatian historian based in the United States. She worked as a fixer during the Croatian War of Independence and emigrated to the United States, obtaining her doctorate from Emory University becoming a scholar of medieval studies. A 2016 Guggenheim Fellowship and 2020 corresponding member of the Croatian Academy of Sciences and Arts, she is author of Bloodless Genealogies of the French Middle Ages (2005), Pornographic Archaeology (2012), and Les Fixeurs au Moyen Âge (2020), as well as co-editor of Violence and the Writing of History in the Medieval Francophone World (2013). She is a full professor at University of California, Los Angeles.

== Biography ==
Zrinka Stahuljak was born on 27 February 1969 in Zagreb. Her parents worked as musicians; her father a violist who worked with HNK Zagreb and her mother a soprano singer. Her maternal grandmother was an Italian Slovene who was born in Trieste and became a postwar refugee in Croatia. She was educated at the Classical Gymnasium in Zagreb, graduating in 1987.

Stahuljak studied at the Faculty of Humanities and Social Sciences, University of Zagreb, where she specialized in English and French language and literature, and studied abroad at the University of Kansas for six months. Her studies at UZ were interrupted by the Croatian War of Independence, though she did graduate in 1993. During the war, she worked as a fixer; Juliette Rigondet at L'Histoire noted that her time as a fixer inspired her academic work, noting that she wrote a book on medieval fixers. Feeling that Croatia had become less open to diversity following independence, she emigrated to the United States in 1993 and returned to UK, where she got her master degree in 1995. She obtained a doctoral degree in medieval French literature from Emory University in 2000. After teaching at Boston University since 2001, she moved to University of California, Los Angeles in 2005, before becoming a full professor there in 2013. In 2019, she became director of UCLA's Center for Medieval and Renaissance Studies.

Stahuljak specializes in Old French and how medieval literature addresses medieval society. Her work includes the books Bloodless Genealogies of the Middle Ages (2005), Thinking Through Chrétien de Troyes (2011, as co-author), Pornographic Archaeology (2013), By The Adventures of Gillion de Trazegnies (2015), Médiéval contemporain: Pour une littérature connectée (2020), and Les Fixeurs au Moyen Âge (2020). She and Noah D. Guynn co-edited a volume, Violence and the Writing of History in the Medieval Francophone World (2013). She also contributed to several books published by The J. Paul Getty Museum. She is also series editor for Éditions Macula's Anamnèses: Médiéval/Contemporain series.

In 2016, Stahuljak was awarded a Guggenheim Fellowship in Medieval & Renaissance Literature. In 2020, she was elected corresponding member of the Croatian Academy of Sciences and Arts.

== Bibliography ==
- Bloodless Genealogies of the French Middle Ages (2005)
- Thinking Through Chrétien de Troyes (2011, with Virginie Greene, Sarah Kay, Sharon Kinoshita, and Peggy McCracken)
- Pornographic Archaeology (2012)
- Violence and the Writing of History in the Medieval Francophone World (co-edited with Noah D. Guynn, 2013)
- The Adventures of Gillion de Trazegnies (2015, with Elizabeth Morrison)
- Les Fixeurs au Moyen Âge (2020)
