= Serb Democratic Forum =

Non-governmental organization in Croatia

- Abbreviation: SDF
- Formation: 8 December 1991; 34 years ago
- Type: NGO
- Purpose: Protection of Serb ethnic minority rights in Croatia
- Headquarters: Zagreb, Croatia
- Location: Ilica, Zagreb, Croatia
- Official language: Croatian and Serbian
- President: Veljko Džakula
- Key people: Milorad Pupovac (founder and first president)
- Website: sdf.hr

Serb Democratic Forum (Serbo-Croatian: Srpski demokratski forum, Српски демократски форум) is a non-governmental organization of the Serbs of Croatia, which in cooperation with national and international organizations and institutions, protects human rights, minority rights, develops and promotes inter-ethnic tolerance and understanding and tries to restore mutual trust and respect.

Forum is a voluntary, non-governmental, non-profit and non-partisan organization. It is the first Serb non-governmental organization founded in Croatia in the aftermath of the disintegration of Yugoslavia.

Forum has won numerous awards for his work in affirmation of human rights and civil society, most notably the Democracy and Civil Society Award in 1998, awarded by the U.S. and EU for promotion of democratic values.

== Serb Democratic Forum-Youth Forum ==
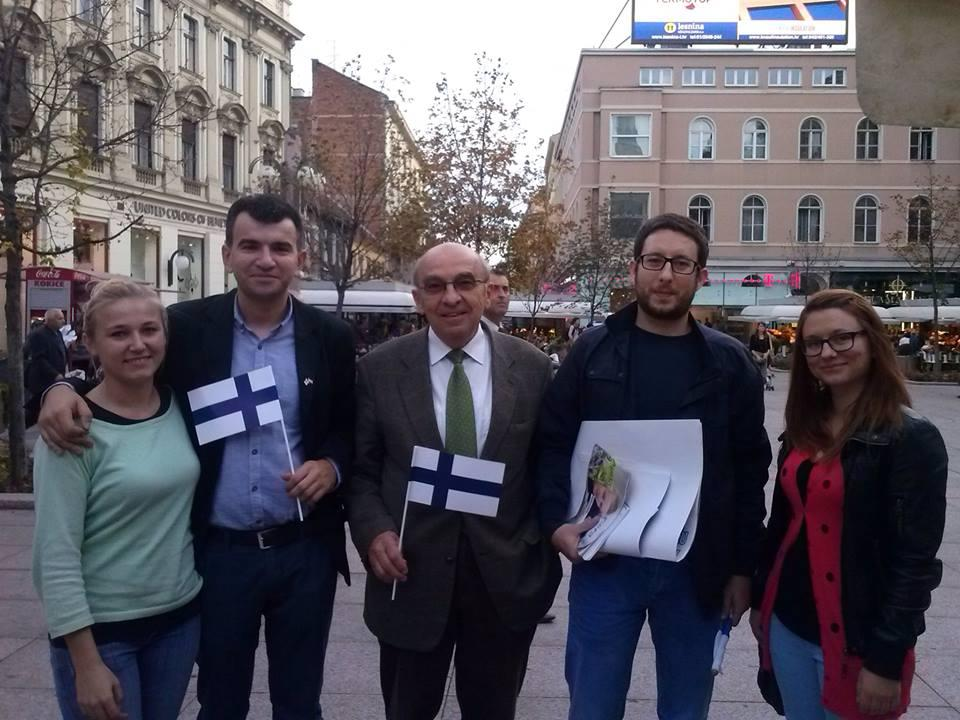
SDF Youth Forum members during public event on Petar Preradović square in Zagreb

Serbian Democratic Forum-Youth Forum (Croatian: Srpski demokratski forum-Forum mladih, Serbian Cyrillic: Српски демократски форум-Форум младих) is an informal group of youth, which is acting as an independent section and youth interest group within Serb Democratic Forum. It was founded on 21 December 2011 on the 20th anniversary of SDF. Group was founded by a group of former students of Serbian Orthodox Secondary School from Zagreb. SDF-Youth Forum is a signatory of International Joint Statement of International Student Movement against the increasing commercialization and privatization of public education. In June 2013 SDF-Youth Forum publicly supported organizers of Zagreb Pride and urged its members as well as other members of Serbs of Croatia community to join event. In October 2013 in cooperation with group from Finnish municipality Muurame SDF Youth Forum conducted a project entitled "Focus on us!" funded by the European Union.

== See also ==
- Serbs of Croatia
- Open Letter on the Position and Status of Serbs in Croatia
