= Filip Erceg =

Croatian writer and journalist

- Born: 1979 (age 46–47); Slavonski Brod, Croatia
- Education: University of Zagreb
- Occupations: writer, journalist and political scientist
- Known for: books, poetry, essays and short stories

Filip Erceg (born 1979) is a Croatian writer, journalist and political scientist.

Erceg was born in Slavonski Brod, but lived his childhood in Bjelovar. He graduated in politology at the Faculty of Political Sciences, University of Zagreb. As a student, he co-edited Hrvatska ljevica and was a member of the Central Committee of the Socialist Labour Party (and later also the Vice-President of the party). He was a member of the editorial board of the philosophical journal 11. teza ("Thesis Eleven") and is on the executive committee of August Cesarec Foundation. Filip Erceg is also a member of the editorial board of a left-wing magazine Novi Plamen. and is credited with inventing the term "altermodernism" as a contemporary reinvention or recalibration of modernism. He has also been publicly outspoken on what he perceives as the retrograde historical phenomena associated with far Right clericalism.

== Works ==
His first book is Krvav povoj rane (2006), ISBN 953-95475-0-4. He has also written the Od socijalizma do pesimizma, a book of political essays published in 2008 by the Demokratska misao publishing house. Erceg has also contributed articles for the Hrvatska književna enciklopedija (The Croatian Literary Encyclopaedia).

He also published poetry, essays and short stories in several magazines including the leading Croatian literary journal Književna republika, Balkan Literary Herald Balkanski književni glasnik etc., and articles in Večernji list, Vjesnik, Novosti, Objektiv, Hrvatska ljevica, Novi Plamen etc.

== See also ==
- Novi Plamen
- 11.teza
- Alter-Modernism
- August Cesarec Foundation
- Hrvatska ljevica
