= Proleksis Encyclopedia =

- Website type: Online encyclopedia
- Available in: Croatian
- Editor: Antun Vujić
- Website: proleksis.lzmk.hr
- Launched: 8 April 2009
- Current status: Active
- Content license: Proprietary

The Proleksis Encyclopedia (Croatian: Proleksis enciklopedija) is the first Croatian general and national online encyclopedia.

Proleksis Encyclopedia features more than 62,000 articles and more than 17,000 photographs, illustrations and maps. It is freely available to registered users of CARNET, the Croatian national research and education network. The users cannot change the encyclopedia's content directly, but they can post comments and corrections, or submit new articles, all subject to approval by the editorial board. The encyclopedia aims to enlarge the number of entries using input from collaborators.

Proleksis Encyclopedia is a result of collaboration between CARNET and Pro Leksis d.o.o., started in February 2008, and is supported by the Croatian Ministry of Science, Education and Sports. It was created by approximately 50 editors, headed by a 9-person editorial board. Its Editor-in-Chief is Antun Vujić.

== See also ==
- Croatian Encyclopedia
- Croatian Wikipedia
