= Albert Goldstein =

- Born: Alberto Goldstein; 31 January 1943; Zagreb, Independent State of Croatia, (now Croatia)
- Died: 18 May 2007 (aged 64); Zagreb, Croatia
- Education: University of Zagreb
- Occupation: Writer

Albert Goldstein (31 January 1943 – 18 May 2007) was a significant Croatian Jewish intellectual, writer, publisher, poet and translator.

== Education and career ==
Goldstein was born in Zagreb on 31 January 1943. In Zagreb he finished elementary and high school. He graduated from the Faculty of Humanities and Social Sciences, University of Zagreb in the field of the history of art and comparative literature. At the beginning of his career, Goldstein worked as a propagandist in Osijek company Saponia d.d., he also worked as head of propaganda in Gavella Drama Theatre, and subsequently he worked for the magazines Teka and Biblioteka in the Student Center at the University of Zagreb until 1979. From 1979 to 1986, Goldstein worked for Graphic Bureau of Croatia. From 1986 to 1993, he also worked for publishing house August Cesarec. In 1993, with his friends Vjeran Zuppa and Nikša Župa, Goldstein founded publishing house Aktant d.o o.. Since 1969, Goldstein was member of the Croatian Writers' Association, and one of the founders of the Croatian Writers Society. Goldstein was also member of the Croatian PEN. He served as president of the Association of Publishers and Booksellers at the Croatian Chamber of Economy. Goldstein served as a board member of the Jewish cultural society Miroslav Šalom Freiberger and was active member of the Jewish community in Zagreb.

== Work ==
Goldstein was attracted to literature in his early youth. He started writing songs in the high school literary section, and began publishing short stories in the magazines Studentski List and Polet. He continued with publishing short stories in the magazines Razlog and Forum. Goldstein published his first book Pamfilos in 1970, and songs Oriented education of Anne Boleyn in 1982.

== Awards and honors ==
Goldstein won the Antun Branko Šimić Award for poetry. He also won the annual literary Ivan Goran Kovačić Award and the Josip Juraj Strossmayer Award. Goldstein was also awarded with the City of Zagreb Award and Kiklop Award for scientific popular book of the year. In Goldstein honor, the Albert Goldstein Award (for the promotion of contemporary Austrian literature) is awarded yearly by Austrian Cultural Forum in Croatia.

== Death and burial ==
Goldstein died suddenly on 18 May 2007 in Zagreb and was buried at the Mirogoj Cemetery.
