= Slobodan Šnajder =

Croatian writer and publicist (1948–2026)

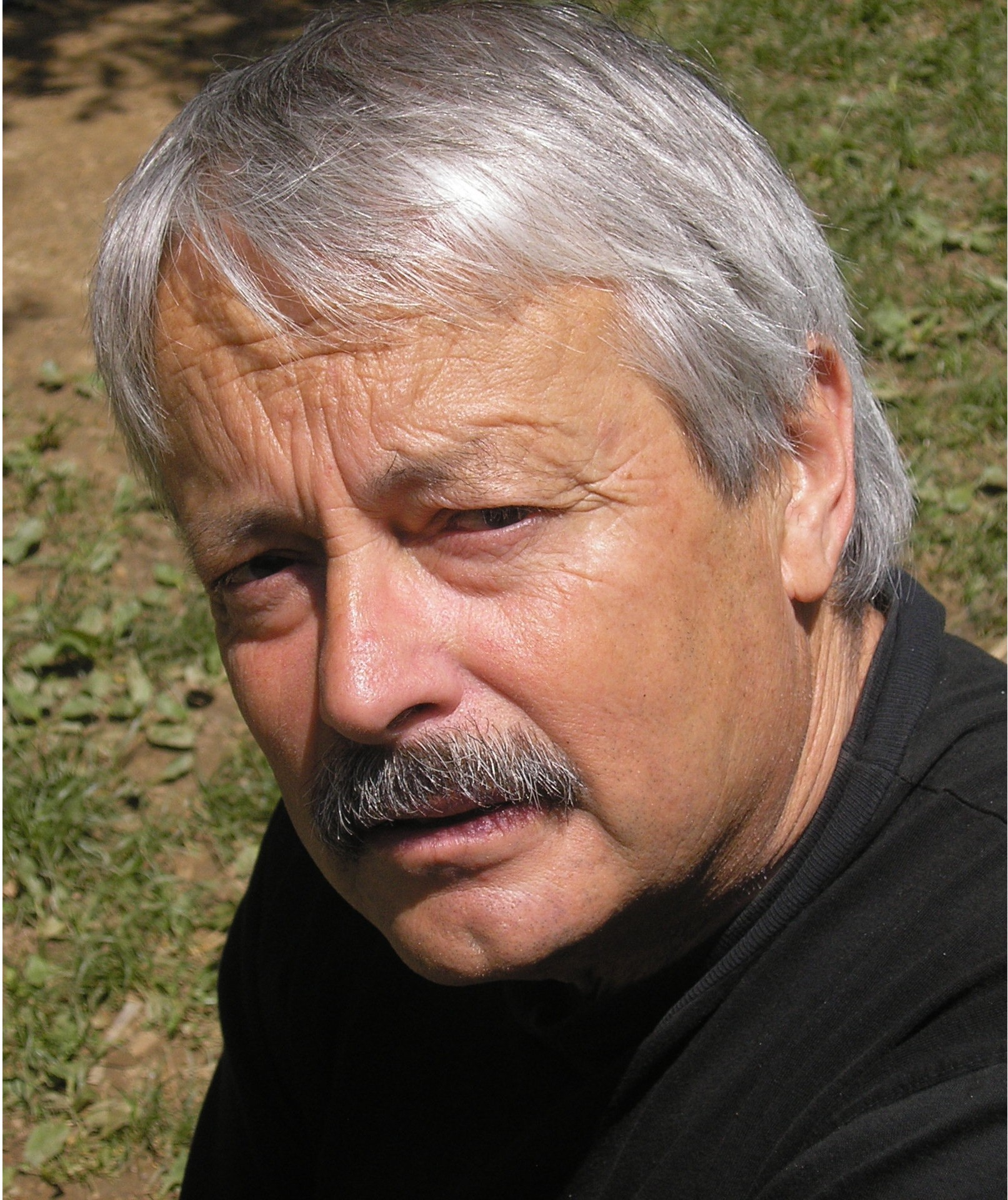
- Born: 8 July 1948; Zagreb, PR Croatia, FPR Yugoslavia
- Died: 30 August 2026 (aged 78); Zagreb, Croatia
- Education: University of Zagreb
- Occupations: Writer, publicist

Slobodan Šnajder (pronounced [slɔ̝bɔ̝̌dan ʃnǎjdɛ̝r]; 8 July 1948 – 30 August 2026) was a Croatian writer and publicist.

== Life and career ==
Šnajder was born on 8 July 1948 in Zagreb, where he graduated in philosophy and English studies from the Faculty of Philosophy.

He was co-founder and editor of the theatre journal Prolog as well as the editor of the editions published by Cekade. His short stories, essays and plays were published from 1966. From January to June 1993, he was a columnist in daily newspaper Glas Slavonije, Osijek, (Reader for the Melancholics), and, from January 1994 until 2013, in a daily newspaper Novi list, Rijeka, (Dangerous Connections). He was a member of the Advisory Board of the left-wing magazine Novi Plamen. His columns and his plays have supporters and opposers. Although Šnajder has been writing prose since ever, his first full-length novel Morendo was issued in 2012.

Šnajder died in Zagreb on 30 August 2026, at the age of 78.

== Works ==
The very first professional production of Šnajder was his early play Minigolf – Drama Theatre Gavella, Zagreb, directed by Dino Radojević.

The Croatian National Theatre of Zagreb (HNK) has staged three of his plays, Kamov, smrtopis (Kamov, the Necrography) (1978), Držićev san (Dream of Držić) (1980), both produced by Ljubiša Ristić, and “Nevjesta od vjetra” (Bride of the Wind), staged by Ivica Boban. Kamov, smrtopis was staged in March 2003 by the Zagreb Youth Theatre (ZKM) in the production of Branko Brezovec.

Dumanske tišine (Silences of a nun) is a play that was staged all over what was Yugoslavia. Another of his plays, “Zmijin svlak” (The Snakeskin), about mass-rapings in Bosnian war, was played all over Europe, from Tübingen, Oslo, Warsaw, Kraków, Veroli near Rome (Festival Dionysia), Frankfurt/Main, Dublin, Vienna, Copenhagen, till Belgrade. This happens to be his mostly played text abroad, but not in Croatia.

But there is another play that seems to be much more controversial right from the date it was issued till today: Hrvatski Faust (Croatian Faust). There are certain similarities between debates in the context of Rolf Hochhuth’s play “Stellvertreter” and this play of Šnajder. The opening night was in Split, 1982, directed by Dino Radojević. Very soon the play was staged in Varaždin (Petar Veček) and Belgrade (Slobodan Unkovski). But all the ideas to make it in Zagreb, where the events described in the play took place in 1942, under regime of ustaša (Croatian “quislings”), were made impossible from the very first moment. Actually, the play takes into consideration the history of the very theatre itself that in the seventies played two Šnajder's plays.

Šnajder’s Faust-play has something to do with what Germans call “Aufarbeitung der Geschichte” (workup of the history). Something like this is never an easy task.

“Croatian Faust” was the first Šnajder’s play of many that was played abroad: in 1987 Roberto Ciulli staged right this play in his Theater a.d. Ruhr. This production was shown everywhere in Germany, in several European countries, and in the USA (Chicago). SAT1 made a special movie-version.

The last production of Šnajder in relative normal circumstances used to be “Bauhaus” (ZKM, directed by Paolo Magelli, at the beginning of 1990). For the next decade Šnajder was excluded from any repertoire and theatre in his native town and land. At the end of 1999 Petar Veček staged Šnajder’s postsocialist grand-guignol “Kod Bijelog labuda” (At the White Swan), again in Varaždin. But Šnajder was played in Europe, because that sort of censorship could not work outside Croatia. Some productions in Europe, besides “Snakeskin”: “Hrvatski Faust” (Croatian Faust, Burgtheater, Vienna, directed by Hans Hollmann), “Utjeha sjevernih mora” (Comfort of the Northern Seas in Frankfurt/Oder, directed by Michael Funke), “Nevjesta od vjetra” (Bride of the Wind, directed by film-maker Werner Schroeter). Miloš Lazin produced Šnajder’s play “Ines & Denise” in French, first in Sarajevo, then his theatre played this title in many French towns. French opening night took place in Villeneuve-les-Avignon in 1997.

A play about Josip Broz Tito, The Bones in Stone, was staged in March 2007 at the National Theatre of Bitola, Republic of Macedonia, directed by Branko Brezovec. In the year 2010 Kruna Tarle made his play written for puppets – Moja draga Tilla! ("My dear Tilla!”. Tilla stays here for the German actress Tilla Durieux who emigrated to Kingdom of Yugoslavia between the wars). That was a coproduction of Zagreb Puppet Theatre and Hfs Ernst Busch, German Academy for puppet-theatre from Berlin. German team made their own version, the opening nights took place in Leverkusen, after that in Berlin.

His later plays were: Enciklopedija izgubljenog vremena (Encyclopaedia of the Wasted Time), which is some sort of post-socialist Jedermann (Everyman), that is to say a sort of ‘transitional’ miracle-play), and Kako je Dunda spasila domovinu (How Dunda Managed to Save Her Country), based on motives of Maupassant.

Encyclopaedia of the Wasted Time was awarded by The Royal Theatre in Cetinje, Montenegro, 2009.

For more than eighteen years Šnajder has been writing weekly political columns, first in Glas Slavonije, daily newspaper issued in Osijek, Croatia, under the title “Početnica za melankolike” (Reader for Melancholics), further on in “Novi list”, issued in Rijeka. These are symbolically entitled Opasne veze (Les Liaisons dangereuses, after de Laclos). The selection covering the columns written until 1999 was published in the book Kardinalna greška (Cardinal Mistake), while the ones published from 1999 to mid-2004 are collected in another book - Umrijeti pod zvijezdom (To Die Under the Star).

Šnajder was a signatory of the Declaration on the Common Language of the Croats, Serbs, Bosniaks and Montenegrins within the project Languages and Nationalisms (Jezici i nacionalizmi). The declaration is against political separation of four Serbo-Croatian standard variants that leads to a series of negative social, cultural and political phenomena in which linguistic expression is enforced as a criterion of ethno-national affiliation and as a means of political loyalty in successor states of former Yugoslavia.

== Bibliography ==
- Kamov (Cekade, Zagreb 1978)
- Hrvatski Faust (Cekade, Zagreb 1981)
- Glasi iz Dubrave (Cekade, Zagreb 1986)
- Der kroatische Faust (Theater heute, 6), Berlin 1987
- Radosna apokalipsa (IC Rijeka, Rijeka 1988)
- Kroatischer Faust (Burgtheater, Vienna 1993)
- Utjeha sjevernih mora (Durieux, Zagreb 1996) ISBN 953-188-057-3
- Knjiga o sitnom (Konzor, Zagreb 1996)
- Skora weza (Dialog, 9) Warsaw 1997
- Snakeskin, Performing Arts Journal, Cambridge, Massachusetts, vol. XX. No 3/1998
- Schlangenhaut (Theater heute, 12), Berlin 1999
- Kardinalna greška (Novi list – Adamić, Rijeka 1999) ISBN 953-6531-52-6
- La dépouille du serpent, (L'espace d'un instant, Paris 2002) ISBN 2-9516638-6-2
- Umrijeti pod zvijezdom (Novi list – Adamić, Rijeka 2005) ISBN 953-219-236-0
- Knjiga o sitnom - proza i dramoleti (Prometej, Zagreb 2005) ISBN 953-6460-51-3
- Kaspariana – eseji (Prometej, Zagreb 2005) ISBN 953-6460-52-1
- Smrtopis – drame (Prometej, Zagreb 2005) ISBN 9789536460533
- Početnica za melankolike – proza (Prometej, Zagreb 2006) ISBN 953-6460-63-7
- Radosna apokalipsa - eseji i kritike (Prometej, Zagreb 2006) ISBN 953-6460-63-7
- Bosanske drame (Prometej, Zagreb 2006) ISBN 953-6460-63-7
  - Боснійські драми (Bosniysky dramy, in Ukrainian, translated by Alla Tatarenko, Видавництво Анетти Антоненко, Lviv 2021) ISBN 978-617-7654-74-1
- 505 sa crtom (Profil International, Zagreb 2007) ISBN 978-953-12-0551-1
- San o mostu (Prometej, Zagreb 2007) ISBN 978-953-6460-76-2
- Neka gospođica B. (Prometej, Zagreb 2007) ISBN 978-953-6460-77-9
- Faustova oklada (Prometej, Zagreb 2007) ISBN 978-953-6460-78-6
- Morendo, novel (Profil International, Zagreb 2011) ISBN 978-953-319-264-2
- Hrvatski Faust i drugi drami (in Macedonian, selected and translated by Jelena Lužina), Blesok, Skopje 2011) ISBN 978-9989-59-360-4
- Le Cinquième évangile (L'espace d'un instant, Paris 2012) ISBN 978-2-915037-66-1
- Tri pjesi (in Russian, selected by Larisa Saveljeva, translated by Natalija Vagapova and Larisa Saveljeva, Tri kvadrata, Moscow, 2012) ISBN 978-5-94607-171-0
- Umrijeti u Hrvatskoj : pet eseja (Fraktura, Zagreb 2019), ISBN 978-953358129-3
- Doba mjedi (TIM press, Zagreb 2015) ISBN 978-953-8075-11-7
  - 2nd edition(TIM press, Zagreb 2016) ISBN 978-953-8075-19-3
  - 3rd edition (TIM press, Zagreb 2018) ISBN 978-953-8075-36-0
  - 4th Croatian and 1st Serbian edition (Akademska knjiga, Novi Sad 2021) ISBN 978-86-6263-347-7
  - 5 th edition (Fraktura, Zagreb 2022) ISBN 978-953839801-8
  - Doba brona (in Slovenian, translated by Sonja Polanc, V.B.Z. Ljubljana, Ljubljana 2017) ISBN 978-961-6468-97-8
  - Исцелување на светот (Isceluvanje na svetot - in Macedonian, translated by Vladimir Jankovski, Antolog, Skopje 2018) ISBN 978-608-243-314-1
  - Reparatur der Welt (in German, translated by Mirjana Wittmann and Klaus Wittmann, Paul Zsolnay Verlag, Vienna 2019) ISBN 978-3-552-0592-4-5
  - La riparazione del mondo (in Italian, translated by Alice Parmeggiani, Solferino, *Milan 2019) ISBN 978-88-282-0273-8
  - De reparatie van de wereld (in Dutch, translated by Roel Schuyt, Uitgeverij Wereldbibliotheek, Amsterdam 2020) ISBN 978-90-284-5046-2
  - Мідна доба (Mydna doba, in Ukrainian, translated by Andriy Lyubka, НОРА-ДРУК, Kyiv 2021) ISBN 978-966-688-055-3
  - Rézkorszak (in Hungarian, translated by Csordás Gábor, Vince Kiadó, Budapest 2022) ISBN 978-963-3031-09-4
  - Los años de bronce (in Spanish, translated by Luisa Fernanda Garrido and Tihomir Pištelek, Armenia, Madrid 2024) ISBN 978-84-18994-45-6
  - The Brass Age (in English, translated by Celia Hawkesworth, Mountain Leopard-Headline Publishing Group, Hachette UK Company, London 2024) ISBN 9781914495229 (eBook: ISBN 978-1-914495-23-6)
- Anđeo nestajanja (Fraktura, Zagreb 2023) ISBN 978-953358602-1

== Literary awards ==
- How Dunda saved Her Country (2008) – Croatian National Award for Plays "Marin Držić"
- The Encyclopaedia of the Wasted Time (2009) – Award of the Royal Theatre, Cetinje, Montenegro; Croatian National Award for Plays "Marin Držić"
- Doba mjedi (2016) – Meša Selimović Literary Award
- Doba mjedi (2016) – Radomir Konstantinović Literary Award
- Doba mjedi (2016) – Mirko Kovač Literary Award
- Doba mjedi (2016) – roman@tportal.hr Literary Award
- Doba mjedi (2016) – “Kočić's feather“ Literary Award
- Umrijeti u Hrvatskoj : pet eseja (2019) – Višnja Machiedo Literary Award

== See also ==
- Novi list
- Novi Plamen
