= Ivo Banac =

Croatian-American historian (1947–2020)

- Born: 1 March 1947; Dubrovnik, PR Croatia, FPR Yugoslavia
- Died: 30 June 2020 (aged 73); Zagreb, Croatia
- Education: Stanford University; Fordham University
- Spouse: Andrea Feldman (m. 2010)
- Scientific career
- Fields: Historian
- Workplaces: Stanford University; Yale University; Central European University

Ivo Banac (Croatian pronunciation: [ǐːʋo bǎːnats]; 1 March 1947 – 30 June 2020) was a Croatian-American historian, a professor of European history at Yale University and a politician of the former Liberal Party in Croatia, known as the Great Bard of Croatian historiography. As of 2012, Banac was a consultant for the Bosnian Institute. He died after a serious illness at age 73.

== Biography ==
Banac was born in Dubrovnik in 1947. In 1959 he emigrated to the United States with his mother, reuniting with his father who had escaped from Yugoslavia in 1947. After his father's death in a traffic accident a year later, Ivo lived with his mother in New York City, where he studied history at Fordham University, graduating in 1969. In the same year Banac moved to California, where he obtained M.Sc. and Ph.D. degrees from the Stanford University. Although he was a member of Students for a Democratic Society, by his own account he was not attracted by the West Coast flower power movement of the late 1960s.

Banac worked at the Stanford University Department of History and Linguistics from 1972 to 1977, and then moved back to the East Coast to teach at Yale University. While at Yale, he earned his tenure, and was a two-time master of Pierson College. His 1984 book The National Question in Yugoslavia: Origins, History, Politics was awarded the Wayne S. Vucinich Prize for the best North American book in the field of Russian and Eastern European studies.

During his stay in the United States, Banac regularly visited Yugoslavia. While visiting Zagreb in 1971, he met Vlado Gotovac and Franjo Tuđman, who would both become major Croatian political figures after the fall of communism. Banac remained in close contact with Gotovac until his death in 2000; on the other hand, he reportedly didn't think highly of Tuđman, describing him as a person who could not tolerate dissent. Nonetheless, Banac organized Tuđman's lecture at Yale University in 1990.

In 1990, Banac was accepted as an associate member in the Croatian Academy of Sciences and Arts. Between 1994 and 1999 he was the director of the Institute on Southern Europe at the Central European University, Budapest. From 1990 onwards, Ivo Banac was also active in Croatian politics. He joined the Croatian Social Liberal Party (HSLS) and became one of the strongest critics of Franjo Tuđman and his government, especially with regards to policy towards Bosnia and Herzegovina. He expressed his criticism in a column written for Feral Tribune. After the HSLS split in 1997, Banac joined the Liberal Party, keeping a critical distance towards the government even after LS became part of a new governing left-centre coalition in 2000.

He often accused Ivica Račan of the SDP of not doing enough to reverse the negative policies of Tuđman's era. Many were surprised to find Banac, who had a reputation of a maverick and independent intellectual, become the leader of the LS. It was even more surprising to see him take the post of Minister of Environmental Protection in 2003. He held that post for only a few months, until the SDP - the party with whom the LS was aligned - lost the election to a rejuvenated HDZ.

He was elected to the Croatian Parliament in the 2003 Croatian parliamentary election. After the elections, Banac advocated a merger of all liberal parties in Croatia. This policy was opposed by Zlatko Kramarić who orchestrated Banac's removal from the party leadership in 2004. Banac left the LS in February 2005 and was an independent representative in the Sabor for the rest of his term. He was publicly criticized for having allegedly mishandled public funds, by renting his personal apartment to himself as office space, as well as furnishing it with taxpayers money. Banac replied, to accusations that such actions constitute mishandling of public funds, that while "the data published in the media are correct, it is all a matter of interpretation, is the glass half full or half empty". Between 2007 and 2009, Banac was the President of the Croatian Helsinki Committee.

At Yale, he was the Bradford Durfee Professor of History Emeritus. He also served as the director of the Council on European Studies at Yale University.

In his later years, Banac was accused of historical revisionism. In a 2017 lecture organized by the Roman Catholic Diocese of Požega Banac stated among other things, that the Ustaše movement was based on the tradition of Hajduks and could not be identified with modern fascist movements. Banac also blamed World War II in Yugoslavia on the King Alexander dictatorship and stated that Communism caused much greater damage than fascism.

== Selected bibliography ==
=== Books ===
- Banac, Ivo (1984). The National Question in Yugoslavia: Origins, History, Politics (1. ed.). Ithaca, N.Y: Cornell University Press. ISBN 9780801416750.
  - Banac, Ivo (1988) [1984]. The National Question in Yugoslavia: Origins, History, Politics (1. printing of the 2. ed.). Ithaca, N.Y: Cornell University Press.
  - Banac, Ivo (1992) [1984]. The National Question in Yugoslavia: Origins, History, Politics (2. printing of the 2. ed.). Ithaca, N.Y: Cornell University Press. ISBN 0801494931.
- With Stalin against Tito: Cominformist splits in Yugoslav communism (1988)
- Cijena Bosne [The Price of Bosnia] (1996)
- Raspad Jugoslavije [The Break-up of Yugoslavia] (2001).

=== Papers ===
- Banac, Ivo (Dec 1982), "Review of Nikša Stančić, Hrvatska nacionalna ideologija preporodnog pokreta u Dalmaciji", The American Historical Review, 87 (5), The American Historical Review, Vol. 87, No. 5: 1426–27, doi:10.2307/1857021, JSTOR 1857021
- Banac, Ivo (1983), "The Confessional "Rule" and the Dubrovnik Exception: The Origins of the "Serb-Catholic" Circle in Nineteenth-Century Dalmatia", Slavic Review, 42 (3), Slavic Review, Vol. 42, No. 3: 448–474, doi:10.2307/2496046, JSTOR 2496046, S2CID 155708670
- Banac, Ivo (1989), "Continuing EEPS", East European Politics & Societies, 4 (1): 1–3, doi:10.1177/0888325490004001001, S2CID 220750967
- Banac, Ivo (1992), "The Demise of Yugoslavia: Introduction", East European Politics & Societies, 6 (3): 219, doi:10.1177/0888325492006003001, S2CID 147699513
- Banac, Ivo (1992), "Historiography of the Countries of Eastern Europe: Yugoslavia", The American Historical Review, 97 (4): 1084–1104, doi:10.2307/2165494, JSTOR 2165494
- Banac, Ivo (1993), "Misreading the Balkans", Foreign Policy, 93 (93): 173–182, doi:10.2307/1149027, JSTOR 1149027
- Banac, Ivo (1994), "EEPS and Editorial Transition", East European Politics & Societies, 8 (3): 381–382, doi:10.1177/0888325494008003001, S2CID 143683927
- Banac, Ivo (1998), "Law, Lawyers and the Holocaust: The Case Against Vichy France", Holocaust and Genocide Studies, 12 (1): 175–177, doi:10.1093/hgs/12.1.175
- Banac, Ivo (2000), "Silencing the archival voice: the destruction of archives and other obstacles to archival research in post-communist Eastern Europe", Arhivski vjesnik, 42 (42)
- Banac, Ivo (2000), "Sorting Out the Balkans: Three New Looks at a Trouble Region", Foreign Affairs, May/June 2000, archived from the original on 2008-12-11
- Banac, Ivo (2002), "The Weight Of False History", Forum Bosnae (15): 201–206
- Banac, Ivo (2008), "From Tito to Milosevic: Yugoslavia, the Lost Country", The Slavonic and East European Review, 86 (1): 180–181, doi:10.1353/see.2008.0067

Political offices
Preceded by Božo Kovačević	Minister of Environmental Protection and Physical Planning; 2003	Succeeded by Marina Matulović-Dropulić
Party political offices
Preceded by Zlatko Kramarić	President of the Liberal Party; 2003–2004	Succeeded by Zlatko Benašić
Non-profit organization positions
Preceded by Danijel Ivin	President of the Croatian Helsinki Committee; 2007–2009	Succeeded by Ivan Zvonimir Čičak
