= List of deputy heads of state of Yugoslavia =

This article lists the deputy heads of state of Yugoslavia from the establishment of the Socialist Federal Republic of Yugoslavia in 1945 until the country's breakup in 1992.

== List ==
No.	Portrait	Name (Birth–Death)	Representing	Term of office			Party	Notes	Refs.
No.	Portrait	Name (Birth–Death)	Representing	Took office	Left office	Time in office	Party	Notes	Refs.
Vice Presidents of the Presidency of the National Assembly; 1946–1953
N/A		Moša Pijade; Моша Пијаде (1890–1957)	SR Serbia	1946	1953	6–7 years	Communist Party of Yugoslavia	Communist Party of Yugoslavia (KPJ) reformed and renamed League of Communists of Yugoslavia (SKJ) in 1952.	—
N/A		Josip Rus; Јосип Рус (1893–1985)	SR Slovenia	1946	1953	6–7 years	Communist Party of Yugoslavia	Communist Party of Yugoslavia (KPJ) reformed and renamed League of Communists of Yugoslavia (SKJ) in 1952.	—
N/A		Dimitar Vlahov; Димитар Влахов (1878–1953)	SR Macedonia	1946	1953	6–7 years	Communist Party of Yugoslavia	Communist Party of Yugoslavia (KPJ) reformed and renamed League of Communists of Yugoslavia (SKJ) in 1952.	—
N/A		Filip Lakuš; Филип Лакуш (1888–1958)	SR Croatia	1946	1953	6–7 years	Communist Party of Yugoslavia	Communist Party of Yugoslavia (KPJ) reformed and renamed League of Communists of Yugoslavia (SKJ) in 1952.	—
N/A		Đuro Pucar; Ђуро Пуцар (1899–1979)	SR Bosnia and Herzegovina	1946	1953	6–7 years	Communist Party of Yugoslavia	Communist Party of Yugoslavia (KPJ) reformed and renamed League of Communists of Yugoslavia (SKJ) in 1952.	—
N/A		Marko Vujačić; Марко Вујачић (1889–1974)	SR Montenegro	1946	1953	6–7 years	Communist Party of Yugoslavia	Communist Party of Yugoslavia (KPJ) reformed and renamed League of Communists of Yugoslavia (SKJ) in 1952.	—
Vice Presidents; 1963–1967
1		Aleksandar Ranković; Александар Ранковић (1909–1983)	SR Serbia	1963	1 July 1966	2–3 years	League of Communists of Yugoslavia		
2		Koča Popović; Коча Поповић (1908–1992)	SR Serbia	14 July 1966	1967	1 year	League of Communists of Yugoslavia		
Vice Presidents of the Presidency; 1971–1991
1 (3)		Krste Crvenkovski; Крсте Црвенковски (1921–2001)	SR Macedonia	1971	1972	1 year	League of Communists of Yugoslavia		
2 (4)		Ratomir Dugonjić; Ратомир Дугоњић (1916–1987)	SR Bosnia and Herzegovina	1972	1973	1 year	League of Communists of Yugoslavia		
3 (5)		Mitja Ribičič; Митја Рибичич (1919–2013)	SR Slovenia	1973	1974	1 year	League of Communists of Yugoslavia		
4 (6)		Petar Stambolić; Петар Стамболић (1912–2007)	SR Serbia	July 1974	July 1975	1 year	League of Communists of Yugoslavia		
5 (7)		Vladimir Bakarić; Владимир Бакарић (1912–1983)	SR Croatia	1975	1976	1 year	League of Communists of Yugoslavia		—
6 (8)		Vidoje Žarković; Видоје Жарковић (1927–2000)	SR Montenegro	1976	1977	1 year	League of Communists of Yugoslavia		—
7 (9)		Stevan Doronjski; Стеван Дороњски (1919–1981)	SAP Vojvodina	1977	15 May 1978	1 year	League of Communists of Yugoslavia		—
8 (10)		Fadil Hoxha; Фадиљ Хоџа (1916–2001)	SAP Kosovo	15 May 1978	15 May 1979	1 year	League of Communists of Yugoslavia		
9 (11)		Lazar Koliševski; Лазар Колишевски (1914–2000)	SR Macedonia	15 May 1979	4 May 1980	355 days	League of Communists of Yugoslavia		—
10 (12)		Cvijetin Mijatović; Цвијетин Мијатовић (1913–1999)	Bosnia and Herzegovina	4 May 1980	15 May 1980	11 days	League of Communists of Yugoslavia		
11 (13)		Sergej Kraigher; Сергеј Крајгер (1914–2001)	SR Slovenia	15 May 1980	15 May 1981	1 year	League of Communists of Yugoslavia		
(4) (6)		Petar Stambolić; Петар Стамболић (1912–2007)	SR Serbia	15 May 1981	15 May 1982	1 year	League of Communists of Yugoslavia	Second term	
(5) (7)		Vladimir Bakarić; Владимир Бакарић (1912–1983)	SR Croatia	15 May 1982	16 January 1983	236 days	League of Communists of Yugoslavia	Second term. Died in office.	
12 (14)		Mika Špiljak; Мика Шпиљак (1916–2007)	SR Croatia	January 1983	15 May 1983	4 months	League of Communists of Yugoslavia		
(6) (8)		Vidoje Žarković; Видоје Жарковић (1927–2000)	SR Montenegro	15 May 1983	15 May 1984	1 year	League of Communists of Yugoslavia	Second term	—
13 (15)		Radovan Vlajković; Радован Влајковић (1924–2001)	SAP Vojvodina	15 May 1984	15 May 1985	1 year	League of Communists of Yugoslavia		—
14 (16)		Sinan Hasani; Синан Хасани (1922–2010)	SAP Kosovo	15 May 1985	15 May 1986	1 year	League of Communists of Yugoslavia		—
15 (17)		Lazar Mojsov; Лазар Мојсов (1920–2011)	SR Macedonia	15 May 1986	15 May 1987	1 year	League of Communists of Yugoslavia		
16 (18)		Hamdija Pozderac; Хамдија Поздерац (1924–1988)	SR Bosnia and Herzegovina	15 May 1987	September 1987	3 months	League of Communists of Yugoslavia		—
17 (19)		Raif Dizdarević; Раиф Диздаревић (1926–2026)	SR Bosnia and Herzegovina	September 1987	15 May 1988	8 months	League of Communists of Yugoslavia		—
18 (20)		Stane Dolanc; Стане Доланц (1925–1999)	SR Slovenia	15 May 1988	15 May 1989	1 year	League of Communists of Yugoslavia		
19 (21)		Borisav Jović; Борислав Јовић (1928–2021)	SR Serbia	15 May 1989	15 May 1990	1 year	League of Communists of Yugoslavia		—
20 (22)		Stipe Šuvar; Стипе Шувар (1936–2004)	R Croatia	15 May 1990	August 1990	2 months	League of Communists of Yugoslavia	Dismissed by the Croatian Parliament.	—
21 (23)		Stjepan Mesić; Стјепан Месић (born 1934)	R Croatia	August 1990	15 May 1991	9 months	Croatian Democratic Union		—
22 (24)		Branko Kostić; Бранко Костић (1939–2020)	SR Montenegro	15 May 1991	December 1991	6 months	Democratic Party of Socialists of Montenegro		—

== See also ==
- List of heads of state of Yugoslavia
- President of Serbia and Montenegro
