= Dubravko Škiljan =

Croatian linguist

Dubravko Škiljan (October 31, 1949 in Zagreb – July 21, 2007 in Zagreb) was a Croatian linguist known for his work on Classical philology and semiotics.

== Life ==
After finishing primary school and classical gymnasium in Zagreb, he enrolled the Faculty of Philosophy at the University of Zagreb where he graduated in 1972 in theoretical linguistics, Latin, Ancient Greek and their literatures. He received his MA in archeology in 1974 with the thesis Greek language of the monuments of Late Antique Salona, and in 1976 his PhD with the theoretical-linguistics thesis titled Linguistics and dialectics.

Since 1972, he worked as a professor of Latin and Ancient Greek in a primary school, and from 1974 on at the Classical Gymnasium in Zagreb. In 1977 he received a full-time job, first as a teacher assistant, then as a docent (since 1977), and finally as a regular professor in 1986, re-elected in 1992, at the Department of General linguistics at the Faculty of Philosophy in Zagreb. During that period, he served as the head of the department, and soon after their foundation, the head of departments of applied linguistics and semiotics. In one turn he served both as the head of the department and a prodean for teaching.

In the period of 1996–2003 he served as a professor of linguistics and semiotics at the Institutum Studiorum Humanitatis, the faculty of post-graduate humanities studies at the University of Ljubljana, where he wrote a post-graduate and doctoral study regarding the speech linguistics and the theory of societal communication, serving as the coordinator of the study. Soon after he returned to his duty of a regular professor of the Faculty of Philosophy in Zagreb.

From 1973 to his death he published more than 250 papers in general and theoretical linguistics, history of linguistics, semiotics, applied linguistics and classical philology (of it 36 in form of books or monographs), participated in numerous scientific conferences in his country and abroad, and led several scientific projects in Croatia and Slovenia. Besides the regular teaching activity in undergraduate and postgraduate courses, he gave lectures in Prague (CEU), Paris (Sorbonne), Trieste (Scuola superiore per traduttori e interpreti), Sarajevo, Novi Sad and elsewhere. He served as a mentor for numerous PhD and MA students in Zagreb and Ljubljana. His book Mappa mundi has earned him the Kiklop award in 2006.

He died in Zagreb in 2007, following a prolonged illness.

== Works ==
- 1976 Dinamika jezičnih struktura
- 1980 Pogled u lingvistiku
- 1985 U pozadini znaka
- 1988 Jezična politika
- 1991 Kraj lingvistike?
- 2000 Javni jezik
- 2002 Govor nacije: jezik, nacija, Hrvati
- 2006 Mappa mundi
- 2007 Vježbe iz semantike ljubavi
