= 2009 student protests in Croatia =

Plenum of the Faculty of Humanities and Social Sciences in Rijeka

Student protests in Croatia 2009, popularly known as Blokada ("The Blockade"), were protests in opposition to the Croatian government's plans to reduce public funding for higher education and instate annual tuition fees for all students. The protests consisted of students taking control of their faculty buildings, including sleeping on faculty grounds, and preventing regular classes and midterm exams from being held.

== Timeline ==
The protests began at the Faculty of Humanities and Social Sciences at the University of Zagreb on Monday, 20 April 2009, when the Independent Students' Initiative for the Right to Free Education started an occupation of the Faculty in Zagreb, Croatia. The occupation lasted for 35 days until 24 May, when the students voted to suspend the occupation. One day after the occupation began in Zagreb, it spread to the University of Zadar (where the entire university was blocked) and then to other cities in the country, including Split, Pula, Rijeka and Osijek. Around 20 faculties and universities in eight Croatian cities were occupied at some point during the 35 days of the protest.

The students who organized the occupation demanded the right to free education for all and the elimination of all tuition fees, at all levels of higher education: undergraduate, graduate and postgraduate. During the occupation, everyone was free to enter and leave the faculty buildings, but regular classes were not allowed to be held. Instead, students organized an alternative educational program, which consisted of lectures, public discussions, workshops, movie screenings and other events. Everyone was free to attend these events, regardless of being students or not. The administration, the library, the bookshop and other facilities within the faculty building were allowed to function as usual, and professors were allowed to operate as usual within their offices; including holding impromptu classes and oral exams.

The central organ of student decisionmaking at the occupied faculty was organized and called the plenum (in reference to plenary sessions). The plenum was an assembly which any attendant, student or not, could participate in. All decisions were made strictly democratically by majority rule of all participants present at the session, including whether the student occupation of the faculty should be continued or ended.

This initial occupation in Zagreb ended soon after the university administration announced that sanctions would be imposed if the action were not ended.

== The Second Blockade ==
On 23 November the students occupied the Faculty of Humanities and Social Sciences in Zagreb once more. After nearly two weeks, the plenum voted to end the occupation on 4 December.

== Support ==
The occupation has received letters of support from individuals and organizations, both from Croatia and from abroad. Among those who have expressed support for their cause were Noam Chomsky, Judith Butler and Slavoj Žižek.

Students of the Faculty of Humanities and Social Sciences in Zagreb co-authored a manual called The Occupation Cookbook in which they described the functioning of their faculty during the occupation.
