= Croatian Helsinki Committee =

- Formation: 1993
- Type: Non-governmental organization
- Headquarters: Zagreb, Croatia
- Website: hho.hr

The Croatian Helsinki Committee for Human Rights (CHC; Croatian: Hrvatski helsinški odbor, HHO) is an organisation founded to protect and promote human rights in Croatia. It was founded on 31 March 1993, initially as a branch of the International Helsinki Federation and latterly as a member organisation of the Helsinki Committee for Human Rights. Since 14 April 2003, the organization has functioned as a local NGO under Croatian law and is supported by independent academics, journalists and professionals dedicated to protecting and promoting human rights in the country.

== Goals ==
It has publicly declared itself dedicated to the following goals:

- Support, promote and implement the principles of the Final Act of Conference of Security and Co-operation in Europe, signed in Helsinki in August 1975, and all documents resulting from this Act: support, promote and implement principles of the UN relating to human issues, and implement in practice the documents of the Council of Europe;
- Support the development of democratic institutions, and promote the rule of law, human rights, and education for these values;
- Organise research and documentation regarding human rights in Croatia;
- Help victims of violations of human rights and those whose rights are threatened.

== Members and employees ==
Croatian Helsinki Committee for Human Rights is an association of up to 30 members. Its professional office involves 10 employees. Membership in the organisation and paid work are strictly separated; the members (including the Chairman, lawyers, etc.) work on a strictly voluntary basis, and employees are not members of the association.

== Field offices ==
Besides the central office in Zagreb CHC also keeps four field offices (Slavonia/Osijek; Vukovar/Karlovac; Knin, Split/ Dubrovnik), by which it ensures coverage of the most critical areas of the country, notably the areas that were directly affected by the war 1991-95. CHC is a member of the International Helsinki Federation, the Human Rights House Network, and the Balkan Human Rights Network; it cooperates with Croatian judiciary, public administration and other relevant institutions, both in dealing with cases of violations of human rights and in developing new systemic solutions.

== Work ==
- Dealing with Human rights violations cases, based on interventions at responsible instances of the system through lobbying, actions in public, and cooperation with relevant authorities
- Education for human rights for youth, thereby compensating for the absence of the topics of human rights in Croatian curricula; education on human rights for young professionals/future decision makers in South-Eastern Europe – in cooperation with the Balkan Human Rights Network (seven schools, involving 30 participants each, from 2001–07); the Summer Schools of Human Rights: education on particular issues of human rights for activists of civil society, journalists, MPs and civil servants in Croatia and other post-Yugoslav countries
- Advanced education for judiciary (judges, public attorneys etc.), subsequently taken over by Judicial Academy; human rights manuals for the police and citizens, in cooperation with the Police Academy (owing to which the subject of human rights was included in the curricula of the Academy)
- Advocating legislation relevant to human rights. The Freedom of Information Act was adopted as a result of advocacy of an NGO coalition coordinated by CHC; the Act makes it possible to demand transparency and accountability much more efficiently. The draft Act on Political Parties was proposed to the Parliament, but was rejected; although formally unsuccessful, this campaign was well recognised in media, and effectively disclosed the resistance of the entire political elite (regardless of party affiliation) to transparency with regard to internal democracy, finances, distribution of electoral candidacies or influential positions etc. Recently, CHC has been involved in preparations of draft laws against discrimination and on free legal aid
- Monitoring freedom of information and expression, defence of rights of journalists, as well as of persons whose rights have been violated by media (privacy, personal dignity, etc.)
- Documentation of civilian victims of the military operations "Bljesak" ("Flash") and "Oluja" ("Storm") in May and August 1995
- Monitoring trials of war crimes in Croatia

== Presidents ==
- 1993–1998 - Ivan Zvonimir Čičak
- 2000–2007 - Žarko Puhovski
- 2007 - Danijel Ivin
- 2007–2009 - Ivo Banac
- 2009–present - Ivan Zvonimir Čičak
