= Žarko Puhovski =

Croatian philosopher and political scientist

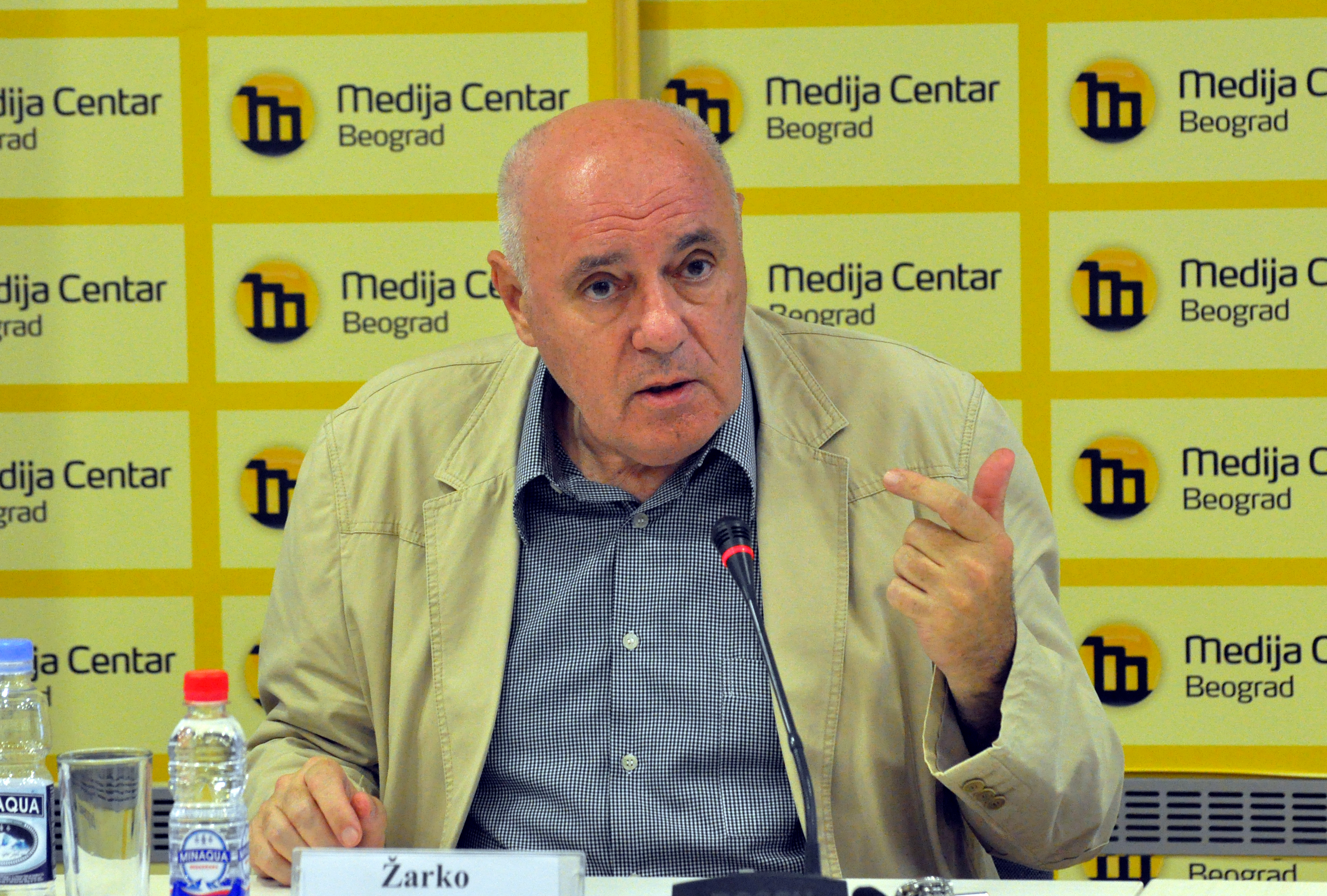
- Puhovski in 2018
- Born: 15 December 1946 (age 79); Zagreb, PR Croatia, FPR Yugoslavia (modern Croatia)
- Education: University of Zagreb
- Occupations: Professor, philosopher
- Spouse: Nadežda Čačinovič (divorced)
- Relatives: Nenad Puhovski (brother)

Žarko Puhovski (born 15 December 1946) is a Croatian professor, political analyst, philosopher and intellectual, former president of the Croatian Helsinki Committee.

== Biography ==
Puhovski was born in Zagreb on 15 December 1946. He was born to a Jewish mother although he has never been an active Jew.

Puhovski received attention at an early age, when he became the president of his gymnasium as a member of the committee of the Alliance of Socialist Youth. He was expelled from the League of Communists of Croatia for a paper on sex and contraception, but was subsequently reinstated by Miko Tripalo, the secretary of the City Committee of the League of Communists.

After studying physics for two years he headed to Germany, but returned to Zagreb in 1968 enrolling at the Faculty of Political Sciences. In December 1969 he was appointed as the editor-in-chief of the Omladinski tjednik ("Youth weekly"), taking only 4 months to be discharged. The newspapers he edited were banned for insulting the President of the Republic. He graduated in 1973, and became an assistant at the Institute of Philosophy of the University of Zagreb. Since 1975, he has been teaching political philosophy at the Faculty of Philosophy. As a professor he held guest lectures at the Universities of Berlin, Frankfurt, London, Brighton, Klagenfurt and Valencia. He is a member of The Ethikon Institute in Los Angeles. He is the scientific director of the European University Center for Peace Studies in Stadtschlaining, Austria.

In 1971 he was a witness for the trial of Croatian student leaders Dražen Budiša and Ivan Zvonimir Čičak.

In 1988, he co-founded of the first alternative Yugoslav political organisation UJDI (Udruženje za Jugoslavensku demokratsku inicijativu, "Association for Yugoslav Democratic Initiative").

He was an active member of the Croatian Helsinki Committee (HHO), since its inception in 1993, serving as its President from 2000 to 2007.

He served as an editor in various periodicals: Ideje (1970–1973); Kulturni radnik (1971–1982); Praxis (1973–1975); Teka (1975); Filozofska istraživanja (1980–1986). He translated numerous books and studies from German and English, published about two hundred works in political philosophy, ethics, philosophy of culture, jurisprudence and social sciences.

He was awarded with European Club of Rectors Extraordinary Award for Peace and against Xenophobia 1993.

== Works ==
Some of his major works include:

- Interes i zajednica (1975)
- Kontekst kulture (1979)
- Povijest i revolucija (1980)
- Um i društvenost (1989)
- Socijalistička konstrukcija zbilje (1990)
- Leksikon temeljnih pojmova politike (1990)
- Politics and Economics of Transition (1993)
