= Novi Plamen =

- Discipline: Politics and culture
- Language: Croatian
- Edited by: Mladen Jakopović (pseudonym Daniel Jakopovich); Ivica Mladenović; Goran Marković

Publication details
- History: 2007–2015
- Publisher: Demokratska misao/Democratic Thought (Croatia)
- Frequency: Bi-annual

Standard abbreviations
- ISO 4: Novi Plamen

Indexing
- ISSN: 1846-386X
- OCLC no.: 643257497

Novi Plamen (transl. "The New Flame") was a left-wing journal for political, social and cultural issues primarily aimed at intellectual audiences in the former Yugoslavia and the related diaspora. It was a leading publication of its kind in the region, covering the entire post-Yugoslav space. It was published by the Demokratska misao (English: Democratic Thought) publishing company based in Zagreb and largely sold at kiosks. Its editors-in-chief were Mladen Jakopović (pseudonym Daniel Jakopovich), Ivica Mladenović and Professor Goran Marković.

The name of the journal is an allusion to the distinguished left-wing magazine Plamen which was published in 1919 and edited by Miroslav Krleža and August Cesarec. It also alludes to Karl Kraus' Die Fackel ("The Torch").

== Profile ==
The journal centred on politics, culture, peace and social justice studies, and on the obstacles and potentials for political, economic and social democratisation. According to the Belgrade newspaper of record Danas, it has "established itself as the only left-wing journal covering the entire ex-Yugoslav territory, managing to gather some of the pre-eminent intellectuals from all the ex-Yugoslav republics. In so doing it has become a factor which contributes to the re-unification of the scattered gems of the South Slavic intelligentsia around, simply put, the idea of a more humane civilisation".

Novi Plamen was also one of the first publications in the region that helped to inaugurate the advocacy of animal rights and animal liberation.

The well-known Croatian writer and journalist Đermano Ćićo Senjanović noted the extensive and inter-disciplinary character of Novi Plamen's issues: "The comrades sent me Novi Plamen the other day and it makes one's head spin. Sociology, philosophy, demographics, history, statistics, international relations... Everything is there. If our Television discussed just one article in prime time each day, there would be work for the entire year". The 2013 issue was published on 342 pages.

The journal had an Advisory Board consisting of well-known international left-wing figures such as Noam Chomsky, philosopher Slavoj Žižek, Ken Coates MEP, John McDonnell MP, Michael Löwy and Jean Ziegler, as well as leading intellectuals and public figures from South East Europe, including the Deputy Prime Minister of the Croatian government Slobodan Uzelac, former Croatian Minister of Economy Ljubo Jurčić MP, former Croatian Minister of Culture Antun Vujić MP, Croatian MP Milorad Pupovac, president of the Croatian Writers' Association Velimir Visković, President of the Croatian PEN Club Nadežda Čačinovič, politician and historian Latinka Perović, Serbian sociologist and philosopher Zagorka Golubović, writers Slobodan Šnajder, Filip Erceg, Igor Štiks and Predrag Matvejević (Vice-President of the International PEN Centre), former Bosnian Minister for Multiculturalism Marko Oršolić and former Minister for Foreign Trade Dragoljub Stojanov, sociologist and politician Slavo Kukić, professor and politician Bogdan Denitch, actor Josip Pejaković, professor Ljubomir Cuculovski, the Canadian academician Darko Suvin and others. Contributors to the magazine have also included the President of Croatia Ivo Josipović, the Nobel laureate for Literature Dario Fo, Slavoj Žižek, Sir Richard Jolly, prominent Dutch politician and UN diplomat Jan Pronk, the British academic and politician Stuart Holland, Igor Mandić, Todor Kuljić, Drago Pilsel, Ljubo Jurčić MP, Biljana Borzan MP, Marin Jurjević MP, Srećko Pulig, Rastko Močnik, Sonja Lokar, Antun Vujić MP, Dušan Pajović and Inoslav Bešker.

Novi Plamen was co-financed with the aid of the Croatian Ministry of Culture.

== Activities and miscellanea ==
Novi Plamen and the Demokratska misao publishing company co-organized an international scientific conference titled Participation, Self-management, Democracy held in Zagreb in November 2007, along with the Left International Forum of the Swedish Left Party. The progressive Belgrade-based politics and economics think-tank Laboratorija progresivnih ideja Dimitrije Tucović ("Laboratory of Progressive Ideas "Dimitrije Tucović"") is closely associated with the journal, and the majority of its materials are texts re-published from Novi Plamen.

The journal was the first to publish a list of political prisoners interned on the Goli Otok labour camp in the 1950s, which provoked much interest in the mass media throughout the region. The journal is an initiative of people whose political socialisation occurred after the fall of former Yugoslavia, and the journal's disagreement with the repressive and undemocratic currents of the "Old Left" has been repeatedly covered and emphasised in the mass media.
