= Vlado Gotovac =

Croatian poet and politician (1930–2000)

Leader of the Opposition
- In office February 1996 – November 1997
- Preceded by: Dražen Budiša
- Succeeded by: Dražen Budiša

President of the Croatian Social Liberal Party
- In office February 1996 – November 1997
- Preceded by: Dražen Budiša
- Succeeded by: Dražen Budiša

Member of the Croatian Parliament
- In office 30 May 1990 – 28 November 1999
- President: Franjo Tuđman
- Constituency: Zagreb-Medveščak

Personal details
- Born: Vladimir Gotovac; 18 September 1930 Imotski, Kingdom of Yugoslavia (modern Croatia)
- Died: 7 December 2000 (aged 70) Rome, Italy
- Resting place: Mirogoj Cemetery, Zagreb, Croatia
- Party: Croatian Social Liberal Party (1989–1997); Liberal Party (1997–2000)
- Spouses: Vlasta Gotovac (m. 1958–1991) Simona Šandrić (m. 1993)
- Children: 1
- Education: University of Zagreb
- Occupation: Poet, politician

Vladimir "Vlado" Gotovac (18 September 1930 – 7 December 2000) was a Croatian poet and politician.

== Early activism ==
In the late 1960s, Gotovac joined the Croatian movement demanding political and economic reform, which eventually led to the Croatian Spring in the early 1970s. Unlike the Prague Spring in Czechoslovakia, the Croatian Spring wasn't violently quashed by military use, although it resulted the period known as "the Croatian silence", alluding to the Yugoslav government's tremendous skill in suppressing any opposition or criticism.

Before being arrested in 1971 Gotovac became the editor-in-chief of Hrvatski Tjednik (The Croatian Weekly), which historian Marcus Tanner explains, "was a real phenomenon – a mass-circulation newspaper with an enormous audience that went way beyond the confines of the Communist Party and made a national reputation."

== Imprisonment ==
Growing up in Tito's Yugoslavia, Gotovac was arrested in January 1972 and sentenced to four years in prison, based on charges of being a "separatist" and "nationalist". In an interview with Swedish television in 1978 he reflected rather dejectedly about his experience:

"No basis was found in my actions or in my activities, but, rather, like in all such processes, criminal actions were assumed and corroborated, not only in my case, but in the cases of a whole group of others whom I know."

Gotovac continued to write in prison, with his most famous piece being his diary, Zvjezdana Kuga ("Starry Plague"), published some twenty years after his release in 1978. And whilst he spent his pre-prison years working as a journalist and editor for TV Zagreb as well as writing literary pieces, he gradually moved into politics after being released from prison.

== Life after release ==
In an interview for a Swedish television channel in 1978 he was asked to elaborate upon his own philosophical beliefs, and he said:

"My entire life I’ve dreamt of a socially just society and exactly for this reason I’ve always been left-oriented. I believed only when justice and freedom existed could human problems be solved. I always believed that only through the solution of these problems could human values be realized. A free individual, an individual who lives justly, only this individual can offer all which the human being has to offer, all of his greatness and all of his human dignity."

His experience in Croatia, dominated by communism, did not manage to pervert or shatter his own view of socialism; rather he felt that the sort of socialism he believed in had nothing whatsoever to do with communism, an ideology that he viewed as nothing more than centralist totalitarianism, of which its followers, he said, "are incapable of thinking freely. They do not know what freedom is!" In 1989, Gotovac joined the newly formed Croatian Social Liberal Party. Due to his passionate eloquence he became one of its most prominent members. As such, he worked very hard to find proper balance between Croatian nationalism and liberalism. In 1991 in the Sabor during a protest rally held in front of Yugoslav People's Army headquarters. He made passionate and defiant speech responding to the generals who at the time were making many threats against Croatia.

In the period from 1990 to 1996 he served as the president of Matica hrvatska.

== Political career ==
Gotovac entered the Sabor in 1992. His eloquent opposition to the authoritarian policies of Franjo Tuđman resulted in Gotovac becoming a standard-bearer of the Croatian opposition.

In mid-1990s Gotovac replaced Dražen Budiša at the leadership of Croatian Social Liberal Party ("HSLS"). His tenure was brief but it also revealed his lack of political talent. During the Zagreb Crisis he allowed himself to be manipulated into embarrassing negotiations with the Croatian Democratic Union, which harmed the reputation of party and its unity.

In 1996 he was chosen as president of the HSLS, where he told his audience: "Do not fear, this is our country and we have the right to rule it as we like!" In that same year he ran as a presidential candidate, but was assaulted during the campaign. He did not win the presidency instead it was claimed by Franjo Tuđman, a fellow former dissident. But Tuđman's victory was disputed by Gotovac, who accused him of manipulating the results. As president, Tuđman did not undertake the sort of reforms hoped for by Gotovac and others, rather he became autocratic, suppressing the media if it dared to criticize him or his system, as well as limiting the civil and political rights of Croatian citizens. The following year Gotovac split from the HSLS to form the Liberal Party. Gotovac participated in a region wide movement of writers becoming politicians, for this occurrence took place in Poland, Hungary and Czechoslovakia, with Václav Havel being one of the most famous writers turned statesman.

Gotovac tried running as a candidate of Croatian centrist and liberal opposition on 1997 presidential election. During the campaign rally in Pula he was assaulted and injured by a Croatian Army officer Tomislav Brzović who was under influence of alcohol and was shouting "Long live Ante Pavelić. I am Ustaša, I will kill you all", upon being arrested. Later it was revealed that Brzović was member of elite security unit guarding president Franjo Tuđman. The incident didn't have much impact on the campaign. This led to the formal split in HSLS. Dražen Budiša, advocating more populist rhetoric and future coalition with HDZ, regained the party leadership. Gotovac, who advocated HSLS remaining true to liberal principles, left HSLS and formed new Liberal Party. This party failed to attract majority of HSLS membership and its voters.

Ironically, Budiša, instead of aligning with HDZ, made a coalition with SDP instead in 1998. LS was left out of it and LS entered Sabor in 2000 only by joining the bloc of centrist parties led by the Croatian Peasant Party.

== Death ==
On 7 December 2000 Gotovac died in Rome, aged 70, from a liver cancer as a complications based on hepatitis, caused by infected injection needle used in his prison infirmary.

Grave of Vlado Gotovac at the Mirogoj Cemetery in Zagreb, Croatia

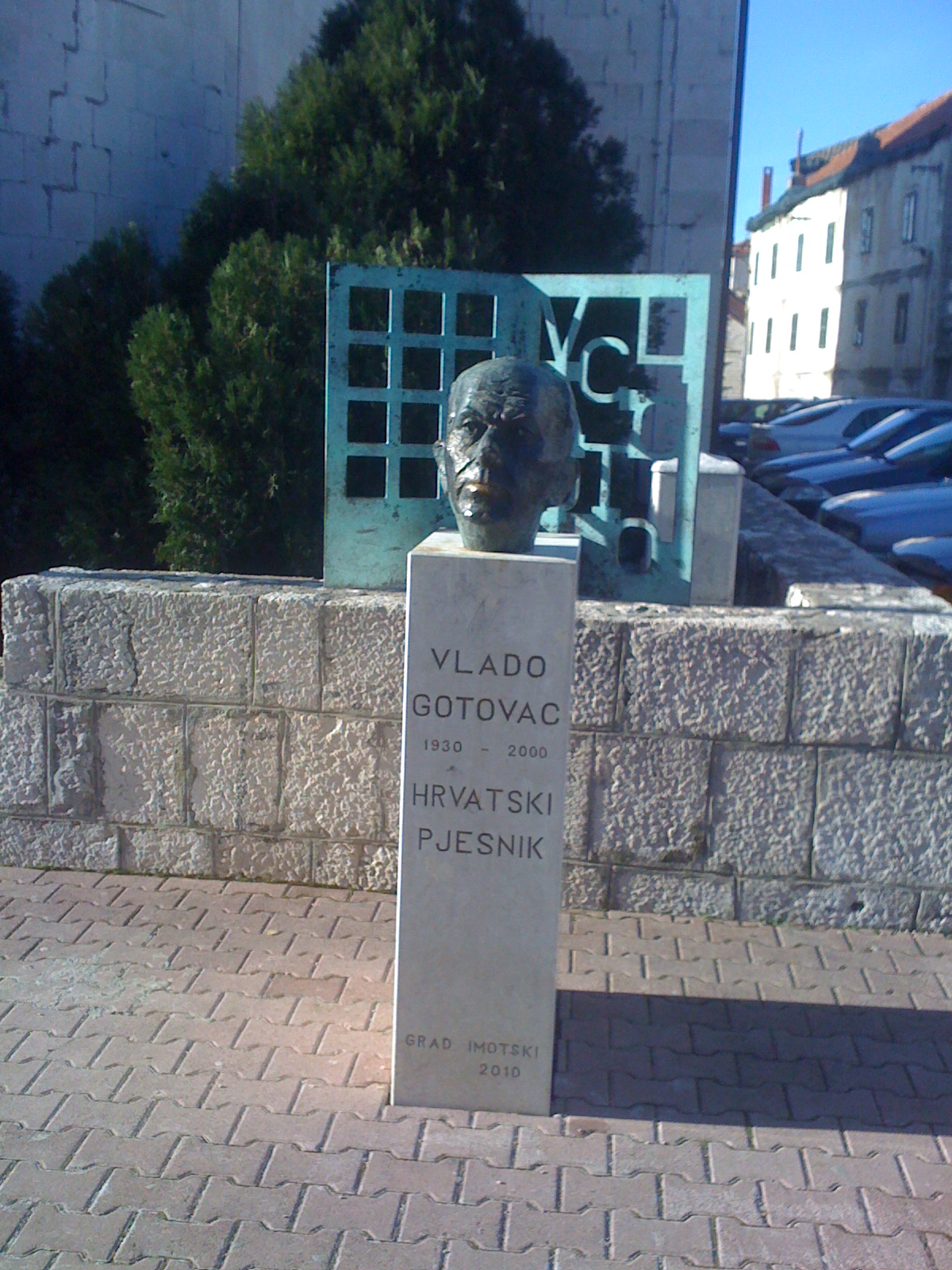
Bust in Imotski

Cultural offices
Preceded by Petar Šegedin	President of Matica hrvatska 1990–1996	Succeeded by Josip Bratulić
Party political offices
Preceded by Dražen Budiša	President of the Croatian Social Liberal Party; February 1996 – November 1997	Succeeded by Dražen Budiša
Preceded by Office created	President of the Liberal Party; January 1998 – May 2000	Succeeded by Zlatko Kramarić
