= Juraj Stahuljak =

Croatian composer

- Born: 16 July 1901
- Died: 8 February 1975 (aged 73)
- Era: 20th century

Juraj Stahuljak (16 July 1901, Sv. Jana – 8 February 1975, Zagreb) was a Croatian composer, organist, choir conductor and pedagogue.

== Biography ==
Juraj Stahuljak (Sv. Jana by Jastrebarsko, 1901 – Zagreb, 1975) was the son of Vladimir Stahuljak (Bjelovar, 1876 – Zagreb, 1960), the first in the family to have music as one of his professions. After studying composition in Zagreb in 1904, Vladimir Stahuljak set out for Budapest, where at the M. Somogy Conservatory he took a degree in composition. When in addition to his musical education he also acquired a certificate to teach Croatian and German, he was eligible for employment in a number of Croatian cities. His first job was in Sv. Jana near Jastrebarsko, from 1900 to March 1903, where his son Juraj was born on 16 July 1901. The father was posted to various different positions and from 1903 to 1908 he lived with his family, in Remete, from 1908 to 1912 in Koprivnica, from mid-August 1912 to February 1914 in Čavle-Cernik over Sušak, and in Sušak itself, to which, after more than a year in Zadar, (March 1914 – mid-1915) the father had been forced to flee because of political denunciations on account of his Croatian patriotism, returning for several months, before joining the teaching staff of the Teacher's School in Petrinja in 1915. The family stayed 10 years in Petrinja, from 1915 to 1925; in this period, Vladimir Stahuljak passed the state exam and in 1918 obtained a certificate as music teacher. Then came a fairly short episode in Kragujevac and from 1926 to his retirement in 1932 he was a teacher in Zagreb. This short review of the career of Vladimir Stahuljak seems essential, for every setting in which the family lived up to 1915 left its marks on the composer Juraj Stahuljak.

From 1915 to 1919 Juraj Stahuljak attended the Upper Town high school in Zagreb, living the while in the Catholic orphanage called Orfanotrofij, since the family, forced to flee from Zadar, had become poor. After graduating from high school, he first of all enrolled in a law course, and at the same time embarked on a course in the Conservatory of the Croatian Music Institute. Poor financial conditions forced him to maintain himself by playing in a cinema, and this is how he earned his living from 1920 to 1924. However, the study of law did not occupy him enough, and he left it, enrolling in the Faculty of Philosophy, taking the study groups history and geography. He took his degree in 1928 and started to work as teacher of history and geography in Zagreb high schools. He remained in this profession until his retirement in 1956.

Born into a family where music was part of daily life—his father a cellist, composer, choirmaster, and organist, and his mother, Paula (née Huber), a noted singer—Juraj Stahuljak was naturally drawn to the study of music. He attended the Croatian Music Institute Conservatory for five years, studying under distinguished educators: Ćiril Junek in music theory, Vjekoslav Rosenberg-Ružić in piano, Milan Reizer in singing, Fran Lhotka in harmony, Franjo Dugan Sr. in counterpoint and fugue, Antun Dobronić in vocal composition, and Blagoje Bersa in instrumentation. The caliber of these teachers ensured a thorough mastery of musical material. He continued his studies at the Zagreb Conservatory (Royal Conservatory) and later the Royal Music Academy, earning his degree in 1924. Stahuljak also obtained a degree in singing and music before a special commission, as was customary, qualifying him to teach in secondary schools.

One of the lasting forms of reproductive music in which Stahuljak was engaged was organ playing in churches, which he began when he was only eleven, standing in for his father; after his arrival in Zagreb for his education he also played it in the Church of St Peter, where he ran the women's voice choir of the church. In addition, he ran the choir of the cadets of Orfanotrofij. He rounded off his career as organist, always in the context of Catholic liturgical practice, with two decades playing the organ of the Parish Church of St John in Zagreb's Nova Ves, in the concluding period from 1956 to 1969. Thus organ playing and choir conducting composed a permanent component in the life of this musician; in addition, one should mention his very frequent work as an accompanist at the piano, particularly together with the distinguished violinist Miroslav Šlik in the 1930s. But what particularly picks him out as a creative personality is his work in composition, with which he started as a fifteen-year-old, writing his first work, Fantasy for piano.

== Works (selection) ==
- Sonata for violin and piano Op 11 (1929)
- Misa Poetica Op 12 for soloists, choir, orchestra and organ (1930)
- Quartet I. for Two Violins, Viola and Violoncello Op. 6 (1932)
- String Quartet No 2 in C minor Op 15 (1932)
- Piano Quintet from the cycle Vlatko Op 14 No 1 (1933)
- Croatian Mass Op 24 for two-part female choir and organ (1942)
- The Charm of a Spring Night, suite (1950)
- Days of Heart and the Repentance Op 28, song cycle for baritone and piano (1953)
