= Predrag Matvejević =

Bosnian and Croatian writer and scholar

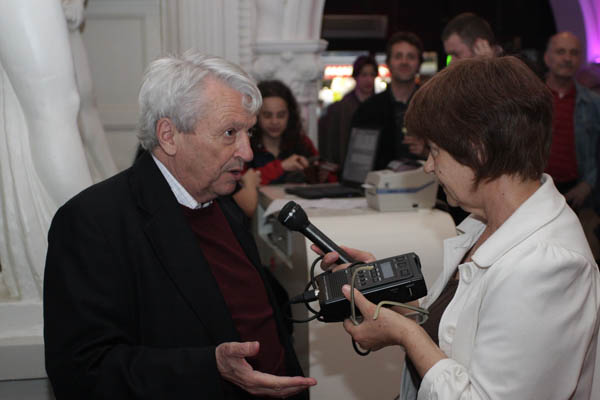
- Predrag Matvejević giving an interview in 2010
- Born: 7 October 1932; Mostar, Kingdom of Yugoslavia
- Died: 2 February 2017 (aged 84); Zagreb, Croatia
- Education: University of Sarajevo; University of Zagreb; University of Paris
- Occupations: Writer and scholar

Predrag Matvejević (7 October 1932 – 2 February 2017) was a Bosnian and Croatian writer and scholar. A literature scholar who taught at universities in Zagreb, Paris and Rome, he is best known for his 1987 non-fiction book Mediterranean: A Cultural Landscape, a seminal work of cultural history of the Mediterranean region which has been translated into more than 20 languages.

== Biography ==
Predrag Matvejević was born in Mostar in 1932, at the time part of the Kingdom of Yugoslavia, modern Bosnia and Herzegovina, into a family of mixed ethnicity, to an ethnic Russian father, who had previously emigrated from Odessa, or in Matvejević's own words, father of Ukrainian ethnicity and Russian language and a native Herzegovinian Croat mother. (Note: https://www.dailymotion.com/video/xvgv79 Drugi format - Predrag Matvejević (Full episode, Daily Motion))

During World War II in Yugoslavia he briefly worked as a military messenger for the Partisans, and after the war he graduated from the Mostar Gymnasium and then went on to study French language and literature, first at the University of Sarajevo and then at the University of Zagreb, where he eventually graduated from. He then continued his studies in France, and in 1967 he earned a doctorate at the Sorbonne with a thesis on socially engaged poetry.

After returning to Yugoslavia he worked as a university professor at his alma mater in Zagreb, where he taught French literature at the Faculty of Humanities and Social Sciences until 1991. Following the breaking out of the Croatian War of Independence, he moved abroad again and taught Slavic literature at the University of Paris III: Sorbonne Nouvelle from 1991 to 1994. In 1994 he moved on to the Sapienza University of Rome, where he taught Croatian and Serbian literatures and language until his retirement at the age of 75 in 2007. He became an Italian citizen and was a candidate for the Party of Italian Communists for the European Parliament, but was not elected.

In honour of his prolific writings on the history of literature and the social history of Yugoslavia and the Mediterranean, he was awarded honorary doctorates from the University of Perpignan, the University of Genoa, the University of Trieste and the University of Mostar. He was also made an honorary vice-president of the worldwide association of writers PEN International, and was a recipient of state decorations awarded by France, Croatia, Slovenia and Italy.

He was a member of the advisory board of the left-wing magazine Novi Plamen.

=== Defamation trial ===
In November 2001, Matvejević published an essay-length article, "Our Taliban", in Jutarnji list. In that article he accused some writers of war mongering during the Yugoslav Wars, among them Mile Pešorda, who filed a defamation lawsuit; the trial started in March 2003. On 2 November 2005, Matvejević was found guilty on the charge of defamation. He was sentenced to five months' probation and ordered to publish the verdict at his own cost in Jutarnji list and to pay 5,000 kuna (circa $1000) in trial costs. Matvejević did not appeal. He stated that an appeal would be an acknowledgment of the verdict and the ones who issued it. On 20 December 2005, the verdict was upheld by an appeals court.

== Selected works ==
(Most of his books have appeared in Serbo-Croatian, French and Italian editions)

- Sartre (essay, 1965)
- Razgovori s Krležom (1969, with several reprints up to 1987)
- Prema novom kulturnom stvaralaštvu (1975)
- Književnost i njezina društvena funkcija (1977)
- Te vjetrenjače (1977)
- Jugoslavenstvo danas (Beograd, 1984)
- Otvorena pisma: moralne vjezbe (1985)
- Mediteranski brevijar (1987)
- Istočni epistolar (1995)
- Gospodari rata i mira (with V. Stevanović and Z. Dizdarević, 2000)
- Druga Venecija (2002)
- Le monde «ex» - Confessions (Paris, 1996)
- Poésie de circonstance (PhD Thesis 1967, Sorbonne)
- Pour une poétique de l'événement (Paris, 1979)
- La Méditerranée et l'Europe - Leçons au College de France (Paris, 1998)
- L'Ile-Méditerranée (Paris, 2000)
- Epistolario dell’altra Europa (Garzanti, Milan 1992)
- De la dissidence (essay, 1993)
- Sarajevo (Motta, Milan 1995)
- Ex Jugoslavia. Diario di una guerra (Magma, Milan 1995)
- Tra asilo ed esilio (Meltemi, Rome 1998)
- Il Mediterraneo e l’Europa (Garzanti, Milan 1998)
- I signori della guerra (Garazanti, Milan 1999)
- Un’Europa maledetta (Baldini e Castoldi, Milan 2005)
