= Ivan Zvonimir Čičak =

Croatian politician, human rights activist and dissident (1947–2024)

- Born: 10 August 1947; Zagreb, PR Croatia, FPR Yugoslavia
- Died: 6 November 2024 (aged 77); Zagreb, Croatia
- Education: University of Zagreb

Ivan Zvonimir Čičak (10 August 1947 – 6 November 2024) was a Croatian politician, human rights activist, and dissident during Croatia's Yugoslavian era, beginning as a prominent student leader at the University of Zagreb during the Croatian Spring. Čičak was arrested and imprisoned several times for his opposition to the Yugoslavian communist regime during the 1970s and 1980s. Following the break-up of Yugoslavia and the independence of Croatia, co-founded the Croatian Helsinki Committee, a human rights organization, and served as its first president from 1993 to 1998 and again from 2009 until his death. In 1997, he was awarded the Bruno Kreisky Prize for Services to Human Rights.

== Biography ==
Čičak was born in Zagreb in 1947. He was the fourth of five siblings. Čičak completed elementary school and high school in Zagreb. While in high school, Čičak was arrested and interrogated for the first time by the Directorate for State Security, the secret police of communist Yugoslavia, for alleged connections to underground Catholic activities. Čičak had submitted a school assignment, in which he stated that Croatia, rather than Yugoslavia, was his homeland, which attracted the attention of communist Yugoslav authorities. However, authorities had no evidence to support their charges that he was affiliated with banned Catholic groups, so Čičak was expelled from his school and banned from studying at any other secondary school.

After the fall of Aleksandar Ranković, one of the most powerful figures in communist era Yugoslavia, Čičak filed a lawsuit in the Supreme Court of Croatia, claiming that authorities had violated his civil rights by banning him from continuing his education. The courts reversed the ban, allowing Čičak to return to school. He enrolled in the University of Zagreb in 1967, where he studied law and became involved in the growing Croatian dissident student movement. During the fall 1968 semester, Čičak began organizing student groups within the Faculty of Humanities and Social Sciences, which again attracted the attention of the communist government. Čičak won first place in the University of Zagreb's oratory public speaking competition in December 1968, leading the British publication, The Economist, to call him the "Cicero of Zagreb."

On 21 November 1971, at the height of the Croatian Spring, Čičak was elected student vice rector of the University of Zagreb. Yugoslavian authorities quickly arrested him and other student leaders in December 1971, accusing them of being Croatian nationalists. Čičak was convicted in a Yugoslav show trial and sentenced to three years in prison. He served eighteen months in Đorđićevoj prison, before being transferred to a prison in Lepoglava, where he spent nine months in solitary confinement. Čičak was released from prison on 31 December 1974 and sent for a one-year mandatory conscription in the Yugoslav People's Army, based in the Serbian city of Požarevac. He returned to the University of Zagreb upon completion of his military conscription and finally graduated with degrees in philosophy and literature from the Faculty of Humanities and Social Sciences.

Unable to find a job due to his convictions, Čičak worked as a bookseller and opened a leather goods workshop. He also married his wife, Marija, during the 1970s, with whom he had five children.

Čičak was arrested again in November 1987 on charges of tax evasion. He was released after two months in prison.

Following the collapse of communism and the beginning of the breakup of Yugoslavia, Čičak helped to revive the Croatian Peasant Party (HSS). He served the HSS vice president before becoming the party's president. During the 1990 Croatian parliamentary election, the first multi-party elections held in the Yugoslav Socialist Republic of Croatia, Čičak formed a political alliance between his Croatian Peasant Party and the Croatian Democratic Union (HDZ), led by Franjo Tuđman. However, Čičak later became disechanted with the policies of the HDZ and became a frequent critic of Tuđman, who became president of Croatia during the 1990s.

Čičak co-founded the Croatian Helsinki Committee (CHC), a human rights organization, in 1993. He served as its first president from 1993 to 1998 and again from 2009 until his death.

Following the 2003 Croatian parliamentary election in November 2003, Čičak joined the Human Rights Committee of the Croatian Parliament.

Čičak died in Zagreb on 6 November 2024, at the age of 78. His funeral was held at the Mirogoj Cemetery in Zagreb on 13 November 2024.
