= Faculty of Humanities and Social Sciences, University of Zagreb =

University department

Coordinates: 45°47′48″N 15°58′16″E

Faculty of Humanities and Social Sciences
- Filozofski fakultet
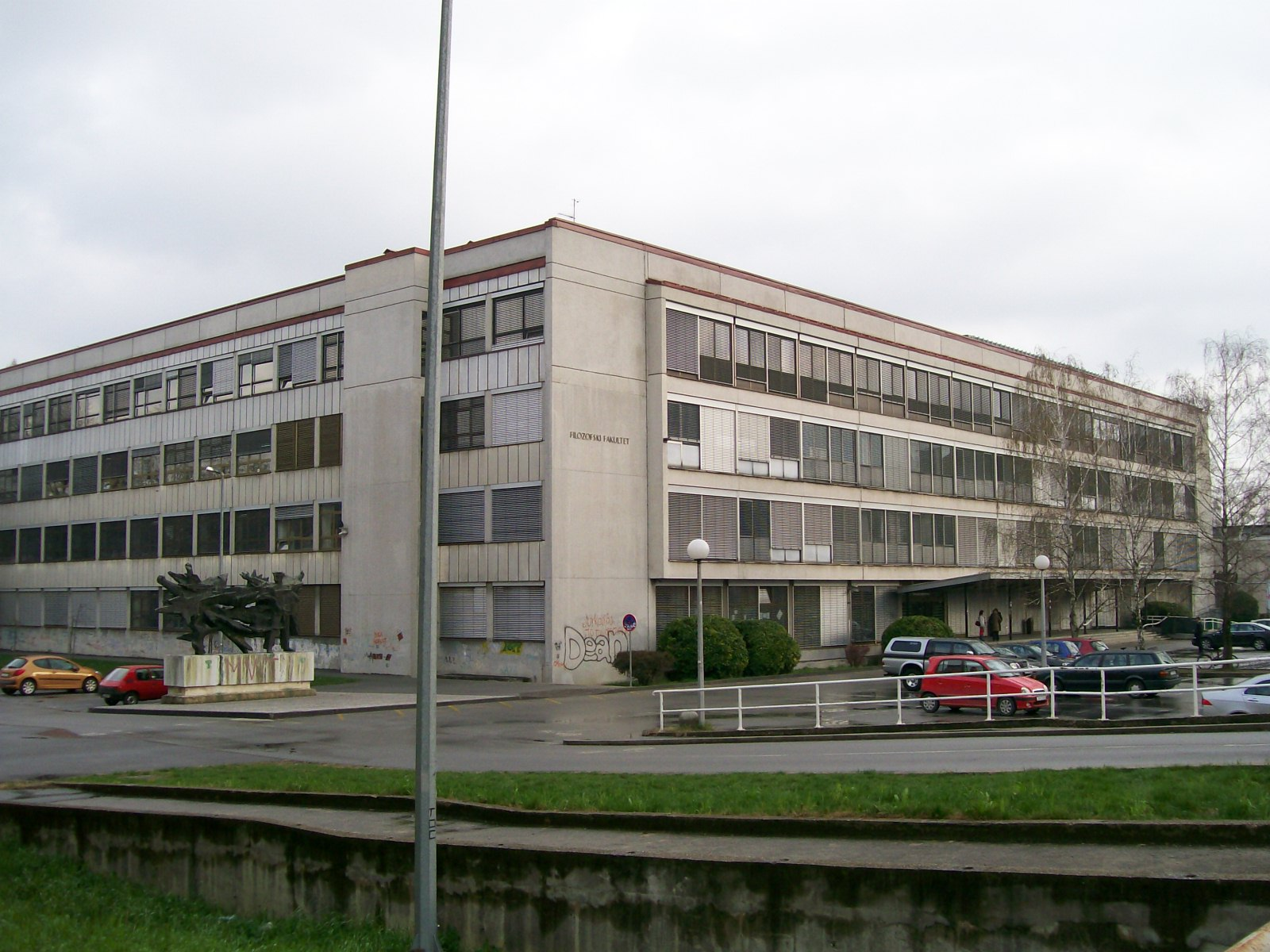
- Faculty building in Zagreb
- Other name: FFZG
- Motto: None
- Type: Public
- Established: October 19, 1874; 151 years ago
- Rector: Stjepan Lakušić
- Dean: Domagoj Tončinić
- Students: 7,800+
- Undergraduates: 3,000+
- Postgraduates: 4,500+
- Location: Zagreb, Croatia
- Colors: Blue and white
- Website: www.ffzg.hr

The Faculty of Humanities and Social Sciences or the Faculty of Philosophy in Zagreb (Croatian: Filozofski fakultet Sveučilišta u Zagrebu) is one of the faculties of the University of Zagreb.

== History ==
The Faculty of Philosophy is the oldest faculty of the University of Zagreb, which dates its founding to 1669. Philosophy and humanities were taught at the university from the very beginning, while a separate faculty first came into existence in 1776 when the university was divided into Faculties of Philosophy, Theology and Law.

In 1874 the modern University of Zagreb was officially established with four faculties: Law, Theology, Philosophy and Medicine. The Faculty of Philosophy was called the Mudroslovni fakultet and had the following chairs:

- Philosophy
- History
- Croatian history
- Slav philology
- Classical philology – Latin
- Classical philology – Greek

The faculty also served as the general scientific faculty, and from 1876 it taught geology, botany, physics, mathematics, and chemistry; from 1877 zoology; from 1882 pharmacy; from 1883 geography.

In 1893, the Chair of Pedagogy was instituted. The Study of Archeology started in 1893. The Chair of German Philology was created in 1895. The Chair of Indo-Germanology was created in 1908, and transformed into the Study of Indology in 1962. The Seminar on Romance Philology first started in 1920. The Chair of Ethnology was created in 1924/1927. The Art History Seminar was created in 1928. The Chair of Psychology was created in 1929. The English Seminar was created in 1935.

Mathematics, pharmacy and other sciences started to split off in several stages, with the creation of separate mathematics and pharmaceutical departments in 1928 (when the faculty was renamed to its current name, Filozofski fakultet), and the splitting off of individual departments into separate faculties in 1942, 1946 and finally in 1963.

The Institute of Phonetics was founded in 1954. The Chair of General Linguistics and Comparative Literature was created in 1956. The Chair of Sociology was created in 1963 (the Faculty of Law had one since 1906). The Study of Swedish started in 1985. In 1989, the Institute for Information Sciences was founded. In 1994, the Study of Hungarology started.

In 2009, the faculty was occupied by students who demanded free education, dubbed Blokada. The peaceful occupation started on April 20, 2009, and ended on May 24. The second occupation started on November 23, 2009, and ended nearly two weeks later.

== Current organization ==
There are two models of study programs: single majors and double majors. The faculty currently enrolls students in 9 single major and 36 double major programs.

The faculty's single major programs include Archaeology, Psychology, Philosophy, Sociology, Pedagogy, Information Science, History, Comparative literature, Italian language and literature (though no more students are being enrolled as of the 2024 reform), and Croatian language and literature.

The double major programs are Philosophy, Archaeology, History, Art History, Sociology, Ethnology and Cultural Anthropology, Comparative literature, Croatian language and literature, Pedagogy, Linguistics, Phonetics and several languages and literature studies (English, French, German, Dutch studies, Hungarian, Italian, Portuguese, Romanian, Spanish, Swedish and Scandinavian studies, Classic Greek and Latin, Turkish, Indology, Sinology, Japanese studies, Judaic studies, South Slavic studies, Ukrainian, Russian, Slovakian, Czech and Polish).

The faculty has more than 700 employees, with more than 500 academic staff as well as more than 600 part-time lecturers.

== Departments ==
The faculty consists of following departments:

- Department of English studies
  - Chair of Scandinavian studies
- Department of archaeology
- Department of ethnology and cultural anthropology
- Department of philosophy
- Department of phonetics
- Department of German studies
- Department of information and communication sciences
- Department of classical philology
- Department of comparative literature
- Department of Croatian studies
- Department of linguistics
- Department of Asian studies
  - Chair of indology
  - Chair of sinology
  - Chair of Japanese studies
- Department of turkology, Jewish and Hungarian studies
  - Chair of turkology
  - Chair of Hungarian studies
  - Chair of Jewish and Holocaust studies
- Department of pedagogy
- Department of history
- Department of history of art
- Department of psychology
- Department of Romance studies
- Department of East Slavic languages and literatures
- Department of South Slavic languages and literatures
- Department of West Slavic languages and literatures
- Department of sociology
- Department of Italian studies
- Independent chair of kinesiology

== Library ==
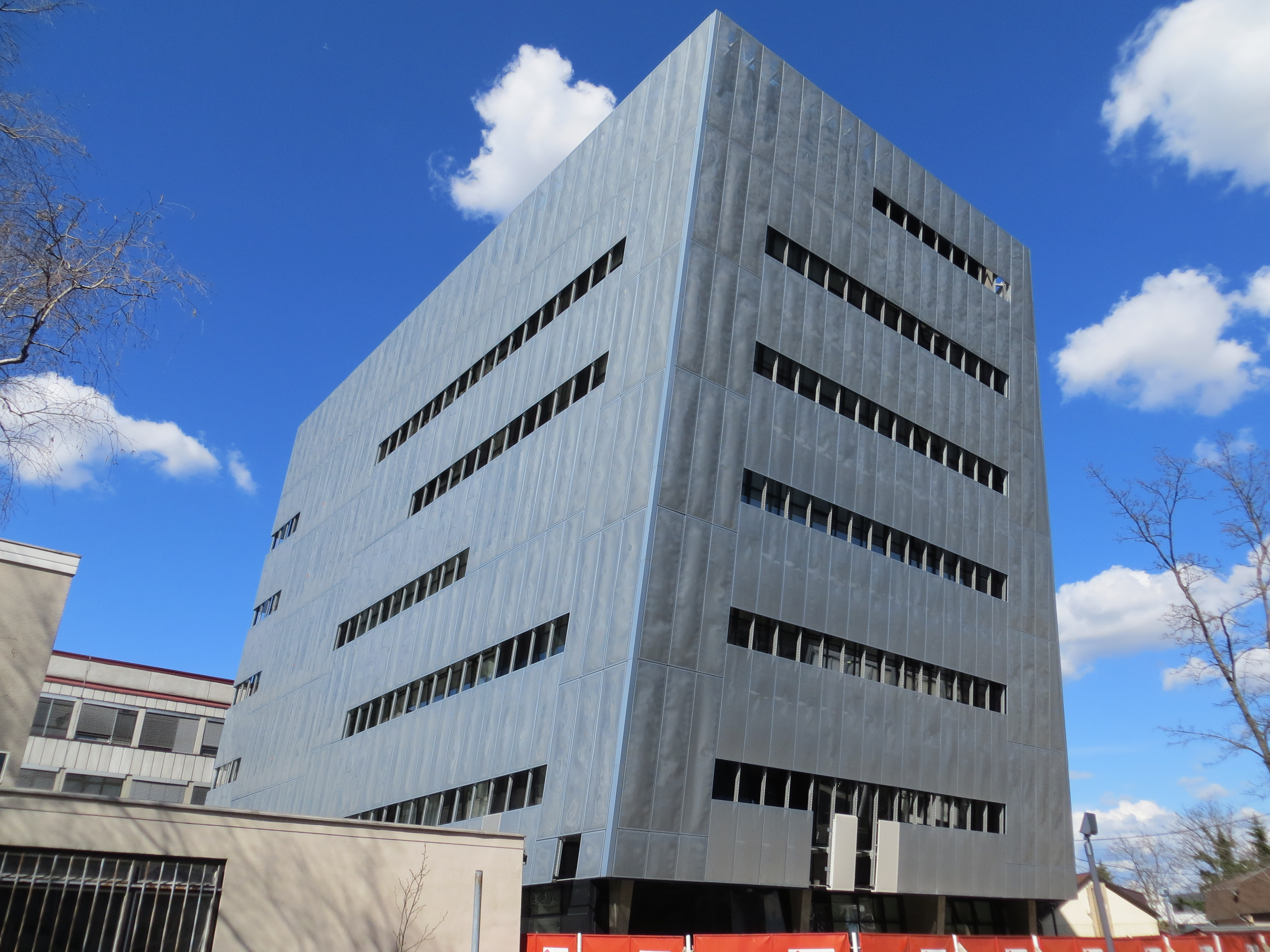
Faculty of Humanities and Social Sciences library.

The Faculty Library moved into a new building opened in March 2009, becoming the second largest library in Croatia (after the nearby National and University Library in Zagreb). It includes 24 department libraries with more than 600 000 books. The library consists of the ground floor, 6 upper floors and a closed repository. The ground floor is mainly intended to be used for reading and writing, while the five upper floors contain books from all departments.

As of 2010, the sixth floor does not function yet. Books which have not been processed yet and are not available for public use are stored in the closed repository, located in the basement.

There are 750 working places and 250 computers available for use. The library is open to all students and employees of the faculty for borrowing books, while members of the public may use books and other resources within the library building. All members and library employees use Koha – a library software which has several interfaces depending on the type of user. The catalogue is open access. It is possible to search for particular books by title, author, ISBN, subject, publisher and call number.

The entire library system is highly technically advanced and equipped with models for supply, catalogization, public borrowing and statistics. One of the main advantages of the library is the 3M RFID system of electronic chips, which enables self-check, allowing users to borrow books by themselves.

== The 2016 protest ==
During 2016, many students and professors became dissatisfied with the current dean, prof. dr. sc. Vlatko Previšić (specifically his organization of the university). Previšić planned to join the Faculty of Humanities and Social Sciences (famous for its many agnostic and atheist students) with the Catholic Faculty of Theology, offering a double major in Theology and another field of the students' choice.

Students at the Faculty of Humanities protested against this, claiming they did not want to be associated with a religious institution. They started posting images online ridiculing dean Previšić, as well as putting them up at various locations across the university (such as public halls, library, and the toilet). The dean responded by hiring personal security guards. Many Croatian universities, institutions and charities also offered their support to the protesting students.

== Notable faculty and alumni ==
- Nevenka Košutić Brozović (1929 − 2013) art historian, literary critic, university professor, and translator
- Rudolf Arapović (1937–2007) writer and dissident
- Nadežda Čačinovič (b. 1947)
- Zlatko Crnković (1931–2013)
- Vesna Girardi-Jurkić (1944–2012)
- Albert Goldstein (1943–2007), intellectual, writer, publisher, poet and translator
- Kolinda Grabar-Kitarović (b. 1968), fourth President of Croatia
- Mirela Holy (b. 1971), politician
- Vladimir Ivir (1934–2011), linguist and translator
- Tvrtko Jakovina (b. 1972), historian
- Hrvoje Klasić (b. 1972), historian
- Snježana Kordić (b. 1964), linguist
- Julijana Matanović (b. 1959)
- Predrag Matvejević (1932–2017), writer and scholar
- Ante Peterlić (1936–2007)
- Nenad Puhovski (b. 1949)
- Žarko Puhovski (b. 1946)
- Milorad Pupovac (b. 1955), linguist and politician
- Vesna Pusić (b. 1953), sociologist and politician
- Nino Raspudić (b. 1975)
- Zvonimir Richtmann (1901–1941), physicist, philosopher, and publicist
- Milivoj Solar (b. 1936)
- Juraj Stahuljak (1901–1975), composer and organist
- Tom Sunic (b. 1953), university professor
- Dubravko Škiljan (1949–2007), linguist
