= List of Croatian Spring participants convicted of political crimes =

In the aftermath of the Croatian Spring, 200–300 people were convicted of political crimes, but thousands more were imprisoned without formal charges for two to three months. Matica hrvatska was banned along with its 14 publications. Tens of thousands were expelled from the League of Communists of Croatia (Savez komunista Hrvatske, SKH), including 741 high-ranking officials including its leaders – Savka Dabčević-Kučar, Miko Tripalo, and Pero Pirker. Further 280 SKH members were compelled to resign their posts and 131 demoted. There were requests for a major show trial with Franjo Tuđman as the main defendant, but Yugoslav President Josip Broz Tito blocked the idea.

- Dražen Budiša – student activist
- Ivan Zvonimir Čičak – student activist
- Goran Dodig
- Šime Đodan
- Vlado Gotovac
- Jozo Ivičević
- Stjepan Mesić – later President of Croatia
- Vlatko Pavletić – later Speaker of the Croatian Parliament
- Ante Paradžik
- Neven Šimac – arrested while teaching assistant at the Faculty of Law in Zagreb, fled to France
- Hrvoje Šošić
- Franjo Tuđman – later President of Croatia, convicted of attempts to topple the "democratic self-managing socialism"
- Marko Veselica

== Sources ==
- Jakovina, Tvrtko (2012). "Mozaik hrvatskoga reformskog pokreta 1971." [1971 Croatian Reform Movement Mosaic]. In Jakovina, Tvrtko (ed.). Hrvatsko proljeće 40 godina poslije [Croatian Spring 40 Years Later] (in Croatian). Zagreb, Croatia: Centar za demokraciju i pravo Miko Tripalo. pp. 385–427. ISBN 9789535687511.
- Ramet, Sabrina P. (2006). The Three Yugoslavias: State-building and Legitimation, 1918–2005. Bloomington, Indiana: Indiana University Press. ISBN 9780253346568.
- Spehnjak, Katarina; Cipek, Tihomir (2007). "Disidenti, opozicija i otpor - Hrvatska i Jugoslavija 1945.–1990" [Dissidents, Opposition and Resistance – Croatia and Yugoslavia, 1945–1990]. Journal of Contemporary History (in Croatian). 39 (2). Zagreb, Croatia: Croatian Institute of History: 255–297. ISSN 0590-9597.
- Vujić, Antun (2012). "Političke osnove nekih interpretacija hrvatskog proljeća" [Political Basis of Some Interpretations of the Croatian Spring]. In Jakovina, Tvrtko (ed.). Hrvatsko proljeće 40 godina poslije [Croatian Spring 40 Years Later] (in Croatian). Zagreb, Croatia: Centar za demokraciju i pravo Miko Tripalo. pp. 17–42. ISBN 9789535687511.
