= Čedo Grbić =

Politician in Yugoslavia and Croatia

- Born: 8 April 1921; Rajić, Yugoslavia (now Croatia)
- Died: 4 December 1994 (aged 73); Zagreb, Croatia
- Occupation: Politician
- Political party: League of Communists of Yugoslavia; League of Communists of Croatia

Čedo Grbić (8 April 1921 – 4 December 1994) was a Croatian Serb communist politician.

Grbić was born in Rajić, a village near Novska. In 1937, he became a member of the League of Communist Youth of Yugoslavia (SKOJ) and a member of the Communist Party of Yugoslavia (KPJ).

After the invasion of Yugoslavia during the World War II, Grbić joined the KPJ-led Yugoslav Partisans and became the political commissar of the 2nd Battalion of the 12th Slavonian Proletarian Shock Brigade. He subsequently also performed the function of the political commissar of the entire brigade and of the 28th Division. In August 1943, Grbić also became the political commissar of an Anti-Chetnik Battalion established in the Western Slavonia, composed entirely of ethnic Serbs, to fight against the Nazi-collaborating Chetniks in the area. After the war, Grbić became the political commissar of the Zagreb-district of the Yugoslav Army and the chief of security service of the Zagreb-district command, holding the rank of a colonel. He was awarded the Order of the People's Hero.

Grbić held the posts of minister of trade and industry in the government of the Socialist Republic of Croatia, and was member of the central committee of the KPJ, then renamed League of Communists of Yugoslavia (SKJ), and a member of the central committee of the League of Communists of Croatia (SKH). In 1971, during the Croatian Spring, Grbić was among the officials whose resignations were demanded by the Croatian Student Federation. The federation organised a student strike in which 30,000 students were demanding the expulsion of Grbić, along with Jure Bilić, Dušan Dragosavac, Milutin Baltić, and Ema Derossi-Bjelajac from the SKH, accusing them of opposing the policies of the SKH leaders Savka Dabčević-Kučar and Miko Tripalo. In particular, they were accused of promoting greater centralisation of Yugoslavia and reduction of powers devolved to Croatia. After the purge of the SKH leadership and the end of the Croatian Spring, Grbić used his position of the deputy speaker of the Croatian Parliament to uphold the policies put in place by the leadership ousted in 1971 and opposed calls for revanchism. Namely, even though Grbić held Yugoslavist ideas, he publicly opposed greater centralisation of Yugoslavia since 1967 and advocated emancipation of national identities within the framework of Yugoslavia. Grbić was also a member of the Parliament of Yugoslavia and the advisory Council of the Federation.

Grbić went on to become the president of the Constitutional Court of Croatia. Historian Sabrina P. Ramet linked the origin of pressure for privatisation of Yugoslav state-owned economy to statements in favour of this process by Grbić in mid-1986.

== Sources ==
- Grbić, Srđan (2012). "Čedo Grbić o hrvatskom proljeću: Prilog o ideologiji jednog vremena" [Čedo Grbić on the Croatian Spring: Review of Ideology of a Period]. In Jakovina, Tvrtko (ed.). Hrvatsko proljeće 40 godina poslije [Croatian Spring 40 Years Later] (in Croatian). Zagreb: Centar za demokraciju i pravo Miko Tripalo. ISBN 978-953-56875-1-1.
- Kokot, Jovan (1986). "Iz borbenog puta 12. slavonske proleterske udarne brigade" [From the Fighting History of the 12th Slavonian Proletarian Shock Brigade]. Časopis za suvremenu povijest (in Croatian). 18 (3). Zagreb: Croatian Institute of History. ISSN 0590-9597.
- Ramet, Sabrina P. (2006). The Three Yugoslavias: State-building and Legitimation, 1918–2005. Bloomington: Indiana University Press. ISBN 978-0-253-34656-8.
