= Šimac =

Šimac is a surname found in Croatia. Notable people with the surname include:

- Dajan Šimac (born 1982), Croatian-German footballer
- Neven Šimac (1943–2025), Croatian lawyer and translator

== See also ==
- Adam Simac (born 1983), Canadian volleyball player
- Šlimac, a village in Bosnia and Herzegovina
