= Marko Koprtla =

Politician in Yugoslavia and Croatia

- Born: 24 May 1929; Gradište, Kingdom of Yugoslavia (now Croatia)
- Died: 4 October 1997 (aged 68); Zagreb, Croatia
- Occupation: Politician
- Political party: League of Communists of Yugoslavia; League of Communists of Croatia; Croatian People's Party

Marko Koprtla (24 May 1929 – 4 October 1997) was a Croatian politician active in Yugoslavia during the time of the Croatian Spring.

Koprtla was born in Gradište, a village near Županja. He was trained as a car mechanic in Vukovar before enrolling in a high school and taking a job of a metal worker until 1955. He attended a higher political school in Belgrade in 1962. Koprtla was a member of the League of Communists of Yugoslavia (SKJ) and the League of Communists of Croatia posted to various functions in the municipalities of Vinkovci and Vukovar. He became the president of the municipal assembly of Vukovar in 1961 and held that post until 1966. Between 1963 and 1965 he was a member of the Parliament of Yugoslavia. In 1965, Koprtla was appointed to the Central Committee of the SKH as the president of its commission for social and economic affairs. In 1968, he became the president of the defence commission of the Central Committee of the SKH. In 1968–1971, Koprtla was additionally appointed a member of the Executive Committee of the SKH's Central Committee tasked with staffing and defence affairs. As a proponent of the reformist faction of the SKH within the context of the Croatian Spring, Koprtla resigned his posts on 12 December 1971 when the reformist SKH leadership under Savka Dabčević-Kučar and Miko Tripalo were defeated and purged from the public and political life. In 1990, Koprtla was among the founders of the Croatian People's Party.
