= Josip Vrhovec =

Croatian communist politician

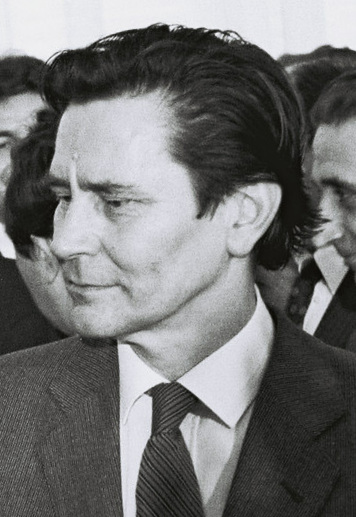
- Vrhovec in 1980

3rd Member of the Presidency of Yugoslavia for SR Croatia
- In office 15 May 1984 – 15 May 1989
- Preceded by: Mika Špiljak
- Succeeded by: Stipe Šuvar

President of the League of Communists of Croatia
- In office 1 July 1983 – 15 May 1984
- Preceded by: Jure Bilić
- Succeeded by: Mika Špiljak

Federal Secretary of Foreign Affairs
- In office 17 May 1978 – 17 May 1982
- Prime Minister: Veselin Đuranović
- Preceded by: Miloš Minić
- Succeeded by: Lazar Mojsov

Secretary of the Executive Committee of the League of Communists of Croatia
- In office 14 December 1971 – 9 April 1974
- President: Milka Planinc
- Preceded by: Pero Pirker
- Succeeded by: Dušan Dragosavac

Personal details
- Born: 9 February 1926 Zagreb, Kingdom of Serbs, Croats and Slovenes (modern Croatia)
- Died: 14 February 2006 (aged 80) Zagreb, Croatia
- Party: League of Communists of Yugoslavia
- Education: University of Zagreb

Josip Vrhovec (9 February 1926 – 14 February 2006) was a Yugoslav and Croatian communist official, best known for serving as Yugoslav Minister of Foreign Affairs between 1978 and 1982, and the Chairman of the League of Communists of Croatia (SKH) from 1982 to 1984.

== Biography ==
Born in Zagreb on 9 February 1926, Vrhovec first became politically engaged during World War II, during which he became a member of the Communist Party of Yugoslavia and the Yugoslav Partisans (1941–1945). After the war, Vrhovec enrolled at the University of Zagreb and graduated from the Faculty of Economics.

Upon graduation, Vrhovec started working at the Zagreb-based daily Vjesnik, where he soon became editor of the newspaper's Wednesday edition (Croatian: Vjesnik u srijedu), which was at the time the company's most popular edition (he had two stints in the position, 1956–1957 and 1959–1963). He also spent several years working as Vjesnik's correspondent from the United Kingdom (1957–1959) and the United States (1963–1967). Upon returning to Zagreb in 1968 he was appointed editor-in--chief at Vjesnik, a position he held until 1970 when he was replaced by Milovan Baletić.

In the late 1960s Vrhovec became more seriously involved in politics and quickly rose to high-ranking positions in the Party following the downfall of the Croatian Spring movement in the early 1970s, as a protégé of Vladimir Bakarić's faction within the League of Communists of Croatia (SKH).

Between 1972 and 1974 he was a member of the SKH Central Committee, and from 1974 to 1978 served as member of the Central Committee of the League of Communists of Yugoslavia (SKJ). During his time at the Central Committee of SKH he reportedly submitted a proposal to then-leader of SKH Milka Planinc to arrest and charge prominent members of the Croatian Spring movement, including Franjo Tuđman, Marko Veselica, Dražen Budiša, Šime Đodan, Vlado Gotovac, and Hrvoje Šošić.

His next office was the highest point of his political career, as he served as Yugoslav Minister of Foreign Affairs from May 1978 to May 1982, under Prime Minister Veselin Đuranović, and during the last two years of Josip Broz Tito's reign before Tito's death in 1980. As minister of foreign affairs, Vrhovec spent the first two years of his term accompanying Tito during his travels abroad.

Following Tito's death, Vrhovec was in charge of shaping Yugoslavia's foreign policy, in which he promoted the idea of improving relations with the West and opening up the country to foreign investments. He reportedly talked with Ronald Reagan several times in the early 1980s about the possibility of introducing multi-party democracy and market economy reforms in Yugoslavia. Despite this, the economic reform commission chaired by Vrhovec from 1985 to 1986 made little mention of democratization.

After serving a full four-year term, Vrhovec was appointed to the post of chairman of SKH, and from May 1984 to May 1989 he represented SR Croatia in the nine-member Presidency of Yugoslavia, a collective body functioning as the head of state. In the latter half of the 1980s Vrhovec was one of the first Yugoslav politicians openly opposing Slobodan Milošević's nationalist policies, at the time when Milošević's rise to power in Serbia began.

Vrhovec is also credited as one of the key people involved in the organisation of the 1987 Summer Universiade, the biggest sporting event ever hosted in the city of Zagreb.

After his term in the Yugoslav presidency ended in 1989, Vrhovec effectively retired from politics. Vrhovec died at the Sisters of Charity Hospital in Zagreb on 15 February 2006 and was buried at Mirogoj Cemetery in Zagreb six days later.

Political offices
Preceded by Miloš Minić	Yugoslav Minister for Foreign Affairs; 1978–1982	Succeeded by Lazar Mojsov
Party political offices
Preceded by Jure Bilić	President of the Presidency of the Central Committee of the League of Communists of Croatia; 1983–1984	Succeeded by Mika Špiljak
