= Secretary of the Presidency of the League of Communists of Croatia =

Administrative leader of the League of Communists of Croatia

- Croatian: Sekretar Predsjedništva Saveza komunista Hrvatske
- Emblems of the LCY
- Type: Chief of staff
- Member of: SKH Presidency
- Appointer: SKH Presidency
- Term length: Two to four years, renewable (1966–1990)
- Constituting instrument: LCY Charter & SKH Charter
- Formation: 26 October 1966
- First holder: Miko Tripalo
- Final holder: Boris Malada
- Abolished: 3 November 1990

The secretary was the highest administrative leader of the Presidency of the Central Committee of the League of Communists of Croatia (SKH), the ruling party of the Socialist Republic of Croatia (SR Croatia) in the Socialist Federal Republic of Yugoslavia and a branch of the League of Communists of Yugoslavia (LCY). The officeholder was elected by and answerable to the SKH Presidency.

== Office history ==
Title	Established	Abolished	Established by
Secretary of the Executive Bureau of the Central Committee of the League of Communists of Croatia; Croatian: Sekretar Izvršnog biroa Centralnog komiteta Saveza komunista Hrvatske	26 October 1966	25 April 1974	6th Plenary Session of the Central Committee of the SKH 5th Congress
Secretary of the Executive Committee of the Central Committee of the League of Communists of Croatia; Croatian: Sekretar Izvršnog komiteta Centralnog komiteta Saveza komunista Hrvatske	25 April 1974	16 May 1982	7th Congress of the League of Communists of Croatia
Secretary of the Presidency of the Central Committee of the League of Communists of Croatia; Croatian: Sekretar Predsjedništva Centralnog komiteta Saveza komunista Hrvatske	16 May 1982	3 November 1990	9th Congress of the League of Communists of Croatia

== Officeholders ==
Secretaries of the Presidency of the Central Committee of the League of Communists of Croatia
No.	Name	Took office	Left office	Tenure	Term of office	Birth	PM	Death	Nation	Ref.
1	Miko Tripalo	26 October 1966	28 March 1969	2 years, 153 days	5th–6th (1965–1974)	1926	1943	1995	Croat	
2	Pero Pirker	28 March 1969	14 December 1971	2 years, 260 days	6th (1969–1974)	1927	1945	1972	Croat	
3	Josip Vrhovec	14 December 1971	9 April 1974	2 years, 116 days	6th (1969–1974)	1926	1944	2006	Croat	
4	Dušan Dragosavac	9 April 1974	26 April 1978	4 years, 17 days	7th (1974–1978)	1919	1942	2014	Serb	
5	Milutin Baltic	26 April 1978	16 May 1982	4 years, 20 days	8th (1978–1982)	1920	1940	2013	Serb	
6	Marijan Kalanj	16 May 1982	14 May 1984	1 year, 364 days	9th (1982–1986)	1932	1958	?	Croat	
7	Stanko Stojčević	14 May 1984	18 May 1986	2 years, 4 days	9th (1982–1986)	1929	1944	2009	Serb	
8	Dragutin Dimitrović	18 May 1986	13 December 1989	3 years, 209 days	10th (1986–1989)	1949	?	2012	Croat	
9	Boris Malada	13 December 1989	3 November 1990	325 days	11th (1989–1990)	1947	1968	Alive	Croat	

== Bibliography ==
- 8th Congress of the League of Communists of Croatia (1978). Stenografske bilješke [Stenographic Notes] (in Serbo-Croatian). Vol. 8, No. 4. Naprijed.
- Marković, Dragan; Kržavac, Savo (1985). Zašto su smenjivani [Why Were They Replaced?] (in Serbo-Croatian). Partizanska knj.
- Lewytzkyj, Borys; Stroynowski, Juliusz, eds. (1978). Who's Who in the Socialist Countries. K. G. Saur Verlag. ISBN 3-7940-3017-6.
- Stallaerts, Robert (2003). Historical Dictionary of the Republic of Croatia (in Serbo-Croatian). Scarecrow Press. ISBN 0-8108-2999-1.
- Stroynowski, Juliusz, ed. (1989a). Who's Who in the Socialist Countries of Europe: A–H. K. G. Saur Verlag. ISBN 3-598-10719-6.
- Stroynowski, Juliusz, ed. (1989b). Who's Who in the Socialist Countries of Europe: I–O. K. G. Saur Verlag. ISBN 3-598-10719-6.
- Stroynowski, Juliusz, ed. (1989c). Who's Who in the Socialist Countries of Europe: P–Z. K. G. Saur Verlag. ISBN 3-598-10719-6.
