= Otokar Keršovani Prize =

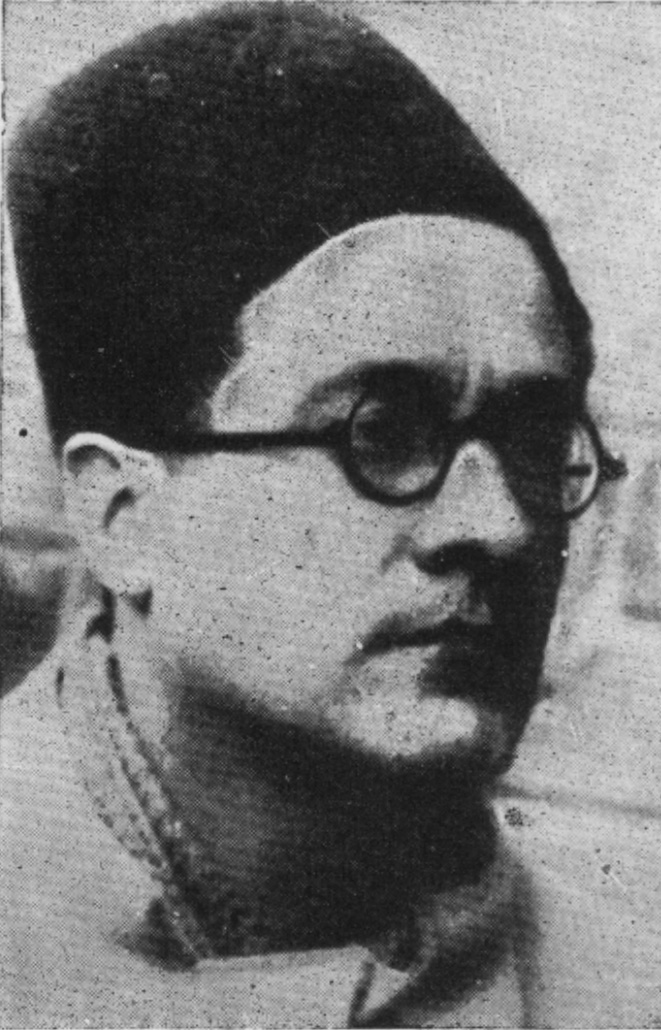
- Otokar Keršovani
- Awarded for: Life achievement in journalism in Croatia
- Country: Croatia
- Presented by: Croatian Journalists' Association.
- First award: 1965
- Website: https://hnd.hr/nagrade

The Otokar Keršovani Prize is a life achievement award for Journalism in Croatia, administered by the Croatian Journalists' Association. The award is decided by a jury, i. e. by two-thirds majority vote of the attending members. The award consists of an acknowledgment and monetary amount.

== Winners ==
- 1965/1966 Mirko Peršen
- 1966/1967 Zvonko Letica
- 1967/1968 Neda Krmpotić
- 1968/1969 Božidar Novak
- 1969/1970 Joško Palavršić
- 1970/1971 Ivo Bojanić
- 1971/1972 not assigned
- 1972/1973 Dara Janeković
- 1973/1974 Zvonko Kristl
- 1974/1975 Šime Mihovilović
- 1975/1976 Mladen Delić
- 1976/1977 Drago Bobić
- 1977/1978 Marko Vojković
- 1978/1979 Ivo Braut, Risto Krunić, Stevo Ostojić
- 1979/1980 Ivan Filipović, Frane Jurić, Ico Voljevica
- 1980/1981 Branko Knezoci, Stjepan Tucak, Miljenko Smoje
- 1981/1982 Milan Bekić, Stanislav Eder, Ante Kesić
- 1982/1983 Drago Auguštin, Tomo Đurinović, Zvonimir Grčman
- 1983/1984 Ante Gavranović, Filip Svetić, Žarko Božić
- 1984/1985 Darko Grubačević, Josip Grubišić-Ćabo, Ratko Zvrko
- 1985/1986 Željko Brihta, Emil Piršl, Josip Šmit
- 1986/1987 Zvone Mornar, Joško Kulušić, Ivo Strahonja
- 1987/1988 Joža Vlahović
- 1988/1989 Živko Vnuk
- 1989/1990 Mira Boglić
- 1990/1991 Just Ivetac
- 1991/1992 Alojz Ševčik
- 1993 Mirko Galić
- 1993 Krešimir Džeba (posthumously)
- 1994 Neda Ritz
- 1995 Bože V. Žigo
- 1996 Mirjana Rakić
- 1997 Veljko Vičević
- 1998 Pero Zlatar
- 1999 Jovan Hovan
- 2000 Dalibor Foretić
- 2001 Branko Lentić
- 2002 Mihail Ostrovidov
- 2003 Žarko Susić
- 2004 Gojko Marinković
- 2005 Igor Mandić
- 2006 Vojo Šiljak
- 2007 Inoslav Bešker
- 2008 Zvonimir Milčec
- 2009 Milan Gavrović
- 2010 Dražen Vukov Colić
- 2011 Ivo Horvat
- 2012 Giga Gračan
- 2013 Branko Šuljić
- 2014 Drago Hedl
- 2015 Fjodor Klarić
- 2016 Jasna Babić
- 2017 Višnja Biti
- 2018 Sanja Modrić
- 2019 Mladen Kušec
- 2020 Mato Jerkić

== Sources ==
- Nagrade HND
