= Neda Krmpotić =

Croatian and Yugoslav journalist (1921–1974)

- Born: 16 October 1921; Senj, Kingdom of Serbs, Croats and Slovenes (now Croatia)
- Died: 22 June 1974 (aged 52); Zagreb, Yugoslavia (now Croatia)
- Occupation: Journalist

Neda Krmpotić (Senj, 16 October 1921 – Zagreb, 22 June 1974) was a Croatian and Yugoslav journalist. She was a contributor and domestic politics editor in Jugopress news agency from 1952 to 1958, before moving on to work in Vjesnik as a contributor and the head of the paper's Belgrade office. In 1963–1966, Krmpotić was the editor-in-chief of Vjesnik, and then a political columnist in Vjesnik and Vjesnik u srijedu. In her column, she supported the reform faction of the ruling League of Communists of Croatia (SKH) and advocated economic and political reforms in Yugoslavia demanded by the SKH leadership during the 1967–1971 Croatian Spring. Following the purge of the SKH reformists in 1971, Krmpotić was compelled to resign. She was banned from further journalistic work and forced to retire in 1972. Krmpotić is the recipient of 1968 Otokar Keršovani Prize – a life achievement award for journalism in Croatia.
