= Zadar school shooting =

Shooting in Croatia

- Location: 44.110636°N 15.229194°E; Zadar Gymnasium; Zadar, Socialist Republic of Croatia
- Date: 9 October 1972 c. 7:50 a.m. (CET, UTC+01:00)
- Target: Teachers
- Attack type: School shooting
- Weapon: Beretta M70 (7,65 mm)
- Deaths: 2
- Injuries: 0
- Assailant: Milorad Vulinović
- Motive: Anti-Croat Sentiment
- Charges: Murder

On 9 October 1972, a 19-year-old student shot two teachers at a gymnasium in Zadar (current-day Vladimir Nazor Gymnasium), in SR Croatia, at the time in Yugoslavia. One teacher died at the scene, while the other died at a hospital.

== Events ==
On the morning of 9 October 1972 Milorad Vulinović, a 19-year-old student of Serbian descent, arrived at Zadar Gymnasium with intent to kill his history teacher, Vica Vlatković (aged 43). With his father's Beretta M70, the student shot Vlatković and the school's sociology teacher Gojko Matulina (aged 33), who came to deescalate and eventually succumbed to his gunshot wounds in a hospital. Not long after the murder, a teacher from the school met Vulinović on the street and saw him take to the nearby pâtisserie named Jadran to eat a cremeschnitte, awaiting arrest.

During a police interrogation, Vulinović stated that he hated Vlatković for his grading and teaching. During the trial, in his defence he also claimed that the victim was a Croatian nationalist. The Croatian Spring happened a year earlier. Court psychiatrists found that Vulinović had a "psychopathic personality" with "a tendency towards schizoid psychopathy". He was sentenced to 15 years in prison on Goli otok, which was the most severe sentence intended for young adults in socialist Yugoslavia.

On October 10 a commemoration was held on Zadar's Narodni trg, and on October 11 around ten thousand people gathered in front of Matulina's home to pay respect. A high school library in Zadar bears the names of Vlatković and Matulina. Two high schools in Zadar were also named after them.

Momir Bulatović, future president of Montenegro, and Šime Vlajki, the son of Croatian actress Jelica Vlajki, reportedly witnessed the incident; both were students of Zadar Gymnasium at the time.

== See also ==
- Zagreb school stabbing
