= Rajić, Sisak-Moslavina County =

Village near Novska, Croatia

Rajić
- Location within Croatia
- Coordinates: 45.304°N 17.105°E
- Country: Croatia
- County: Sisak-Moslavina
- City: Novska

Area
  - Total: 33.9 km^{2} (13.1 sq mi)

Population (2021)
  - Total: 752
  - Density: 22.2/km^{2} (57.5/sq mi)
- Time zone: UTC+1 (CET)
  - Summer (DST): UTC+2 (CEST)

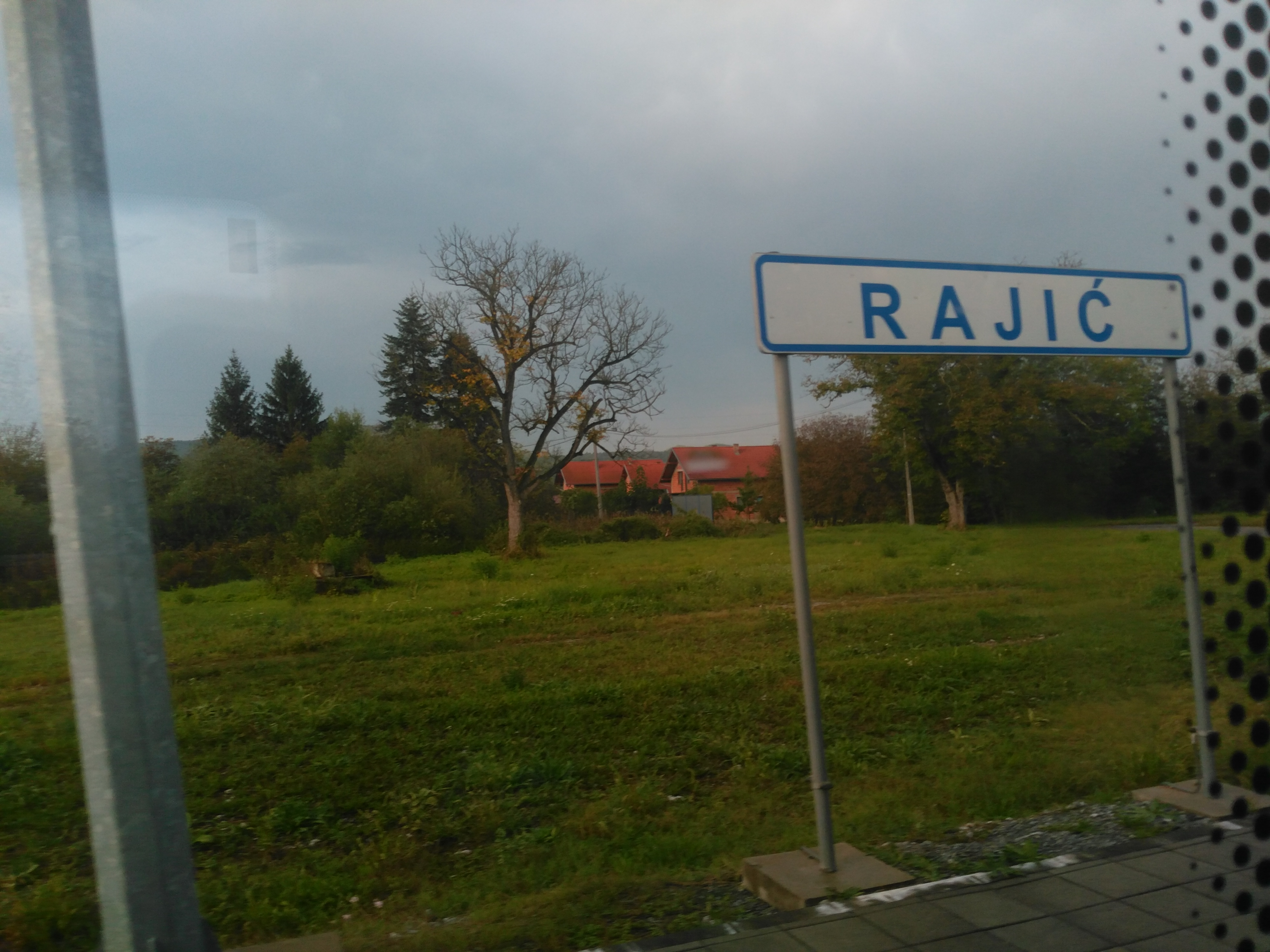
Rajić Train Station.

Rajić is a village near Novska, Croatia, with a population of 875 (as of 2011).

== Notable residents ==
- Čedo Grbić
- Karla Kovačević
