= Marijan Čavić =

Yugoslav communist

- Born: 10 March 1915; Zagreb, Kingdom of Croatia-Slavonia, Austria-Hungary
- Died: Late 1941 (aged 26); Jasenovac, Independent State of Croatia

Marijan Čavić-Grga (10 March 1915 – 1941) was a Yugoslav communist. He was captured in Karlovac and executed 1941 in the Jasenovac concentration camp.

== Biography ==
He was secretary of the local committee of the League of Communists of Croatia for Karlovac. In his earliest youth he was involved in the workers' movement and he became a syndicalist at this time. In 1939 he joined the Communist Party. Immediately before the war he became the secretary of the committee for the third region of the KPH in Zagreb. After occupation and formation of the Independent State of Croatia, Marijan Čavić organized illegal work in his area and participated in sabotage and other actions. By decision of the Central Committee, in mid-August 1941 he left Zagreb and went to Karlovac.

On 16 October 1941, in Karlovac, the Ustasha police arrested Čavić. The Ustasha police tortured him, but he did not want to tell them his name. In order to end his suffering, Čavić tried to commit suicide. Wanting to extort a confession from him at all costs, the police sent him to the Karlovac hospital for treatment. The Communist Party organization after found out that his secretary was in the hospital made a plan to save him from the hospital. Partisan rescue operation under command of Većeslav Holjevac enter to Karlovac but did not succeed, because in the meantime the Ustashas returned him to prison, so Holjevac and his Partisans did not find him in the hospital.

After this Partisan action, Čavić was transferred to Zagreb. Another attempt was made to save him, however and that attempt failed. Marijan Čavić was taken to the Jasenovac concentration camp where he was killed at the end of 1941.

== Legacy ==
He was proclaimed a national hero of Yugoslavia on 27 November 1953.
