= Neven Šimac =

Croatian lawyer and translator (1943–2025)

- Born: 6 December 1943; Osijek, Independent State of Croatia
- Died: 4 June 2025 (aged 81); Paris, France
- Education: Faculty of Law, University of Zagreb; University of Paris II
- Occupation(s): Lawyer, translator

Neven Šimac (6 December 1943 – 4 June 2025) was a Croatian lawyer and translator.

== Life and career ==
Šimac graduated from the Faculty of Law in Zagreb (1965) and received his doctorate in 1971 from the French University of Paris II. The same year he started working as a teaching assistant at the Faculty of Law in Zagreb, but after the collapse of the Croatian Spring he was arrested. He emigrated to France, where he worked in the state administration (1972–95). He was the founding president of the Conseil représentatif des institutions croates et de la Communauté française (CRICCF). He was one of the founders of Matica hrvatska in Paris (1970).

As an advisor for the European Bank for Reconstruction and Development, he contributed to the post-Cold War development of Croatia and Bosnia and Herzegovina (Phare programme 1995-1999), as well as Croatia's accession to the European Union. He was an advisor (2000–2004) to the governments of the Czech Republic, Latvia, Lithuania and Poland in the process of accession to the European Union.

Šimac died on 4 June 2025, at the age of 81.

== Works ==
- Le Nettoyage éthnique: documents historiques sur une idéologie serbe (1993) (co-authors Marc Gjidara and Mirko Dražen Grmek)
