= Krešimir Džeba =

Croatian and Yugoslav journalist and politician

- Born: 27 August 1935; Dubrovnik, Yugoslavia (now Croatia)
- Died: 11 March 1993 (aged 57); Graz, Austria
- Education: Faculty of Economics & Business, University of Zagreb
- Occupations: Journalist, politician
- Political party: Croatian People's Party

Krešimir Džeba (Dubrovnik, 27 August 1935 – Graz, 11 March 1993) was a Croatian and Yugoslav journalist and politician. In 1954, Džeba graduated from the Faculty of Economics & Business, University of Zagreb and started working in Vjesnik in 1957 as a contributor and a columnist before becoming the editor of the economic section. In 1966, Džeba became the editor-in-chief of the Vjesnik u srijedu. In his editorials published in the period of the Croatian Spring, Džeba advocated economic and political reforms. After the purge of the reformist leadership of the ruling League of Communists of Croatia in late 1971, Džeba was forced to resign his post and took up work in Vjesnik-run marketing agency instead. At the time of the 1990 Croatian parliamentary election, Džeba entered politics and became the vice-president of the Croatian People's Party.
