= Central Committee of the 11th Congress of the League of Communists of Croatia =

A Central Committee of the League of Communists of Croatia was elected by the 11th Congress, and was in session from 1989 to 1990.

== Members ==
Listed by members receiving highest number of votes:

1. Ivo Družić
2. Ivica Račan
3. Branko Caratan
4. Jelica Bobić
5. Boris Malada
6. Ivan Gržetić
7. Nada Ciković
8. Hela Dragović
9. Zvjezdana Grudić
10. Ivan Hanžek
11. Ivan Matija
12. Dušan Plećaš
13. Ivo Aničić
14. Igor Antončić
15. Ivan Babić
16. Marija Babić
17. Slavica Babić
18. Darko Bakarić
19. Milutin Baltić
20. Vera Ban-Marković
21. Serđo Baskijera
22. Ivica Bašić
23. Dušan Bilandžić
24. Aleksandar Broz
25. Ivica Car
26. Darko Crnković
27. Mirko Cvjetičanin
28. Marija Erceg
29. Ivica Fabris
30. Božo Farkaš
31. Josip Filipović
32. Božidar Frančić
33. Franjo Galeković
34. Ivan Gajer
35. Ante Bilić
36. Dragutin Grđan
37. Josip Gudelj
38. Željko Hapek
39. Antun Ignac
40. Ivo Jelavić
41. Ante Jelčić
42. Ivica Jerčinović
43. Marin Jurjević
44. Branko Jurlina
45. Ante Krstulović
46. Sveto Letica
47. Marko Lolić
48. Jelena Lovrić
49. Zdenko Mance
50. Ivan Marković
51. Vili Matula
52. Luka Miletić
53. Luka Obradović
54. Tatjana Olujić-Musić
55. Jože Perić
56. Antun Peruško
57. Jure Premuž
58. Nada Rudan
59. Boris Santo
60. Zorica Stipetić
61. Ivan Šifter
62. Marija Šola
63. Zdravko Tomac
64. Lordan Zafranović
65. Ratimir Žanetić
66. Ivica Župetić
67. Branko Žuža
68. Tome Bacelić
69. Mirjana Bezbradica
70. Silva Bukvić
71. Božo Čapeta
72. Boris Garek
73. Ignjatije Malobabić
74. Danijel Vereš
75. Jadranka Višnjić

== Bibliography ==
- Komunist, 15 December 1989
