= Croatian Spring =

1967–1971 Yugoslavian political crisis

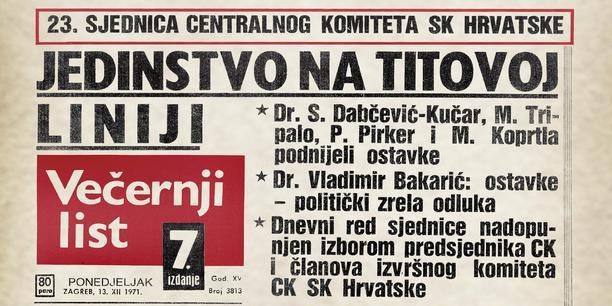
- Večernji list issue of 13 December 1971 announcing the resignation of the SKH leadership with the title Jedinstvo na Titovoj liniji, lit. 'Unity in line with Tito' or 'Unity on Tito's terms'
- Date: 17 March 1967 – 1 December 1971; (4 years, 8 months and 2 weeks)
- Location: Croatia, Yugoslavia
- Caused by: Level of financial contribution to the federal budget; Perception of cultural and demographic threats to the Croats and the Croatian language
- Goals: Greater decentralisation of the Yugoslav federation and economic reforms; Greater affirmation of the Croatian language and culture of Croatia
- Methods: Power struggle within the SKH; Demonstrations (November 1971); Publication of Croatian orthography, revision of textbooks
- Result: Resignation of the reformist leadership of the SKH; Matica hrvatska and Prosvjeta banned; 200–300 prosecuted for political crimes, several thousand detained without charge, tens of thousands expelled from the SKH or demoted

Parties
Reformist faction of the SKH; Matica hrvatska; Croatian Student Federation	Conservative faction of the SKH; SKJ (November–December 1971); Prosvjeta; Praxis School

Lead figures
Savka Dabčević-Kučar; Miko Tripalo; Pero Pirker; Dragutin Haramija; Petar Šegedin; Vlado Gotovac; Šime Đodan; Marko Veselica; Franjo Tuđman; Ante Paradžik; Ivan Zvonimir Čičak	Miloš Žanko; Stipe Šuvar; Dušan Dragosavac; Jure Bilić; Milutin Baltić; From April 1971: Josip Broz Tito; From November 1971: Vladimir Bakarić

The Croatian Spring (Croatian: Hrvatsko proljeće), or Maspok, (Note: See notes on naming in #Legacy in the final decades of Yugoslavia) was a political conflict that took place from 1967 to 1971 in the Socialist Republic of Croatia, at the time part of the Socialist Federal Republic of Yugoslavia. As one of six republics comprising Yugoslavia at the time, Croatia was ruled by the League of Communists of Croatia (SKH), nominally independent from the League of Communists of Yugoslavia (SKJ), led by President Josip Broz Tito. The 1960s in Yugoslavia were marked by a series of reforms aimed at improving the economic situation in the country and increasingly politicised efforts by the leadership of the republics to protect the economic interests of their respective republics. As part of this, political conflict occurred in Croatia when reformers within the SKH, generally aligned with the Croatian cultural society Matica hrvatska, came into conflict with conservatives.

In the late 1960s, a variety of grievances were aired through Matica hrvatska, which were adopted in the early 1970s by a reformist faction of the SKH led by Savka Dabčević-Kučar and Miko Tripalo. The complaints initially concerned economic nationalism. The reformists wished to reduce transfers of hard currency to the federal government by companies based in Croatia. They later included political demands for increased autonomy and opposition to real or perceived overrepresentation of the Serbs of Croatia in the security services, politics, and in other fields within Croatia. A particular point of contention was the question of whether the Croatian language was distinct from Serbo-Croatian.

The Croatian Spring increased the popularity of figures from Croatia's past, such as the 19th century Croat politician and senior Austrian military officer, Josip Jelačić, and the assassinated leader of the Croatian Peasant Party, Stjepan Radić, as well as an increase in patriotic songs, works of art, and other expressions of Croatian culture. Plans were made for increased representation of Croatia-related materials in the school curriculum, measures to address the overrepresentation of Serbs in key positions in Croatia and to amend the Constitution of Croatia to emphasise the nature of the republic as the national state of Croats. There were also demands for increased powers for the constituent republics at the expense of Yugoslavia's federal government. These issues increased tensions between Croats and the Serbs of Croatia, as well as between the reformist and conservative factions of the SKH.

While other republics, the SKJ, and Tito himself were not initially involved in the internal Croatian struggle, the increasing prominence of Croatian nationalism led Tito and the SKJ to intervene. Similar to reformers in other Yugoslav republics, the SKH leadership was compelled to resign. Nevertheless, their reforms were left intact and most demands of the ousted leadership were later adopted, ushering in a form of federalism that contributed to the subsequent breakup of Yugoslavia.

== Background ==
=== Economic crisis ===
After World War II, Croatia was one of six republics within federal Yugoslavia.

In the early 1960s, the Federal People's Republic of Yugoslavia was a federation according to its constitution (comprising the people's republics of Bosnia and Herzegovina, Croatia, Macedonia, Montenegro, Serbia, and Slovenia), but de facto operated as a centralised state. The Yugoslav economy was in recession, prompting economic reforms, which were hastily implemented and proved ineffective. By 1962, the country's economic difficulties worsened, prompting debate on the foundations of the economic system. In March 1962, President Josip Broz Tito convened the extended central committee of the country's ruling party, the League of Communists of Yugoslavia (SKJ), to discuss the role of the SKJ and the relationship between the central government and the constituent republics. The meeting exposed a clash between Serbs, openly supported by a Serb deputy prime minister Aleksandar Ranković, and Slovene members of the body, particularly Miha Marinko and Sergej Kraigher, cautiously supported by Slovene deputy prime minister Edvard Kardelj. The Slovene delegation advocated for devolving power and authority to the constituent republics. The Serb delegation sought to preserve the central government's monopoly on decision-making and the distribution of tax revenue to less-developed republics. As it was less developed than PR Slovenia and PR Croatia, PR Serbia would have benefited from such an arrangement. In 1963, a new constitution was adopted, granting additional powers to the republics, and the 8th Congress of the SKJ expanded the powers of the SKJ branches the following year.

=== Politicisation of reforms ===
Further economic reforms were adopted in 1964 and 1965, transferring considerable powers from the federation to the republics and individual companies. Some of the reform measures exacerbated conflict between the banks, insurers, and foreign trade organisations owned by the Yugoslav government versus those owned by the constituent republics, a conflict that became increasingly political and nationalist. Competing alliances were established. Ranković gained the support of Bosnia and Herzegovina and Montenegro, in addition to Serbia. Slovenia was supported by Croatia, based on the belief of Vladimir Bakarić—the Secretary of the Central Committee of the League of Communists of Croatia (SKH)—that decentralisation would benefit others in Yugoslavia. Bakarić persuaded Krste Crvenkovski, the head of the League of Communists of Macedonia (SKM), to support the Slovene–Croatian reformist bloc, which managed to enact substantial legislation curbing federal powers in favour of the republics. The conflict was framed as a contest between Serbia's interests against those of Slovenia and Croatia.

In Croatia, positions adopted by Ranković's allies in the League of Communists of Serbia (SKS) and the League of Communists of Montenegro (SKCG) were interpreted as hegemonistic, which in turn increased the appeal of Croatian nationalism. By the mid-1960s, the United States consul in Zagreb, Helene Batjer, estimated that about half of SKH members and 80 percent of the population of Croatia held nationalist views.

=== Peak of the reformist forces ===
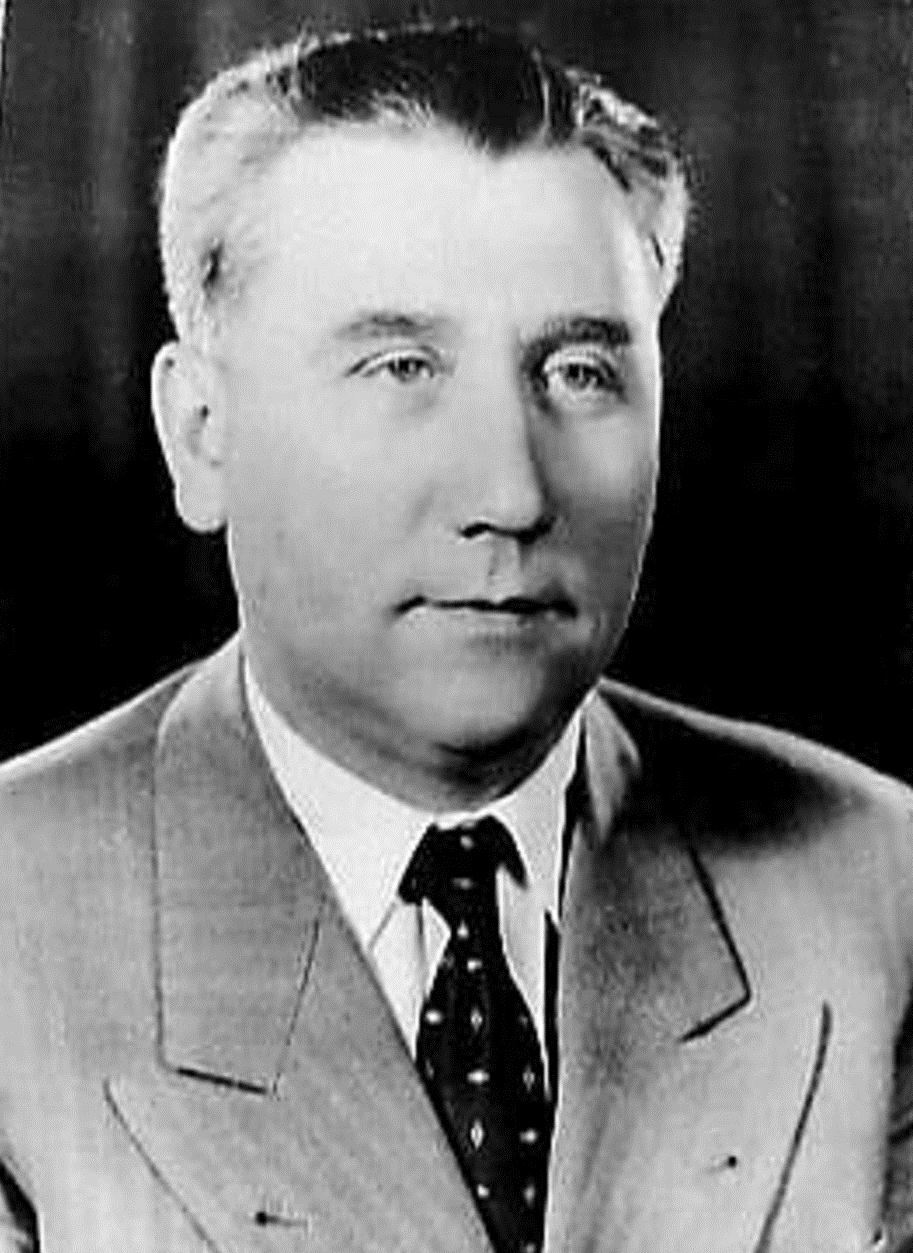
The fall of Aleksandar Ranković ushered in a period of reformist dominance in Yugoslavia

By early 1966, it was clear that the reforms had not produced the desired results. The SKJ blamed the Serbian leadership for resistance to the reforms. In early 1966, Kardelj persuaded Tito to remove Ranković from the SKJ Central Committee and dismiss him as vice president of Yugoslavia. Ranković was accused of plotting to seize power, disregarding the decisions of the eighth congress of the SKJ (December 1964), abuse of the State Security Administration directly or through allies, and illegally wire-tapping the SKJ leadership, including Tito himself. Tito saw Ranković's removal as an opportunity to implement greater decentralisation. In devolving power to constituent units of the federation, Tito assumed the role of sole arbiter in inter-republican disputes.

In 1967 and 1968, the Yugoslav constitution was amended once again, further reducing federal authority in favour of the constituent republics. The peak of the reformist coalition occurred at the 9th congress of the SKJ in March 1969, during which decentralisation of all aspects of the country was proposed. A World Bank loan for the construction of motorways caused a major rift in the reformist coalition after the federal government decided to shelve plans to develop a highway section in Slovenia and build one highway section in Croatia and one in Macedonia instead. For the first time, a constituent republic (Slovenia) protested a decision of the federal government, but Slovene demands were rejected. The situation became heated, prompting the Slovene authorities to publicly state that they had no plan to secede. In the aftermath of the affair, the Slovenian authorities withdrew their support for the reformist coalition. Regardless, the SKH and the SKM pressured the SKJ to adopt the principle of unanimity in decision-making, obtaining veto power for the republican branches of the SKJ in April 1970.

Student demonstrations erupted in Belgrade in June 1968 against authoritarian aspects of the Yugoslav regime, market reforms, and their impact on Yugoslav society. The students were inspired by the worldwide protests of 1968, and criticism of the reforms leveled by the Marxist humanist Praxis School. They opposed decentralisation and criticised nationalism in Yugoslavia through the Praxis journal. In November 1968, Petar Stambolić and other SKS leaders whose political views were a blend of communist dogmatism and Serbian nationalism, were removed on Tito's initiative. Tito specifically blamed Stambolić for not stopping the student demonstrations in a timely fashion. The replacements were Marko Nikezić, as the president, and Latinka Perović as the secretary of the SKS, respectively. Nikezić and Perović supported market-based reforms and a policy of non-interference in other republics' affairs except where officials from those republics denounced Serbian nationalism outside of Serbia.

== National revival ==
=== Grievances ===
By the end of the 1960s, the economic reforms had not resulted in discernible improvement within Croatia. Belgrade-based federal banks still dominated the Yugoslav loan market and foreign trade. Croatia-based banks were pushed out from Dalmatia, a popular tourist region, and hotels there were gradually taken over by large companies based in Belgrade. Croatian media reported that favourable purchase agreements for Serbian companies were the result of political pressure and bribery, and the situation was framed as an ethnic rather than economic conflict.

Furthermore, the situation was worsened by a perception among Croatian nationalists of cultural and demographic threats to Croatia from the following policies: use of school textbooks to suppress Croatian national sentiment, a campaign to standardise the Serbo-Croatian language in a way favouring Serbian dialects, demographic displacement by Serbs, and encouragement of Dalmatian regionalism. Calls for the establishment of autonomous Serbian provinces in Dalmatia and elsewhere in Croatia, seen as a threat to Croatia's territorial integrity, added to these concerns. Many people in Croatia believed these to be substantive threats intended to weaken the republic, and rejected alternate explanations of them attributing the changes to economic phenomena or results of modernisation. Early in 1969, a number of grievances were listed in an article by the Croatian Writers' Association president, Petar Šegedin, in Kolo, a magazine published by Matica hrvatska. In the article, Šegedin accused the Yugoslav government of attempting cultural assimilation of Croatia.

=== Language question ===
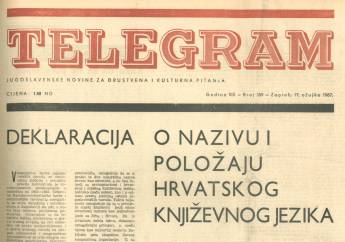
The Declaration on the Name and Status of the Croatian Literary Language was announced in the Telegram, a contemporary literary newspaper on 17 March 1967.

In 1967, the first two volumes of the Dictionary of Serbo-Croatian Literary and Vernacular Language based on the 1954 Novi Sad Agreement were published, sparking controversy about whether Croatian was a separate language. Both volumes excluded common Croatian expressions or treated them as local dialect while Serbian variants were often presented as the standard. The unrelated 1966 Serbo-Croatian dictionary published by Miloš Moskovljević further inflamed the situation by omitting the term "Croat" from the vocabulary.

The Declaration on the Name and Status of the Croatian Literary Language was issued by 130 Croatian linguists, including 80 communists, on 17 March 1967. The declaration criticised the 1967 dictionary and called for official recognition of Croatian as a separate language and for a requirement for the government of Croatia to use the Croatian language in official business. This step would have disadvantaged the many Serb bureaucrats in Croatia. The declaration drew "A Proposal for Reflection" in response, drafted by 54 Serbian writers calling for TV Belgrade to use Cyrillic script and to provide education for the Serbs of Croatia in the Serbian language. There were also several denunciations of the declaration on the Name and Status of the Croatian Literary Language from the SKJ within days. The declaration was not universally supported in Croatia. The deputy speaker of the Sabor, Miloš Žanko, denounced Franjo Tuđman, the head of the Institute for the History of the Workers' Movement of Croatia, and Većeslav Holjevac, the head of the Croatian Heritage Foundation, for hiring known Croatian nationalists. The declaration marked the beginning of the four-year long period of increased Croatian nationalism commonly referred to as the Croatian Spring.

Matica hrvatska withdrew from the Novi Sad Agreement on 22 November 1970 because Matica srpska insisted that Croatian was only a dialect of Serbian. Matica hrvatska went on to publish a new Croatian dictionary and orthography manual by Stjepan Babić, Božidar Finka, and Milan Moguš, which was condemned by Serbia. The Croatian nationalists reacted by promoting linguistic purism and by revising school textbooks to increase coverage of Croatian history and culture. Matica hrvatska became the rallying point of the nationalist revival, and its economic secretary Šime Đodan was particularly popular. In 1970, Matica hrvatska's membership grew from about 2,000 to 40,000, increasing its political influence. It also enabled complaints to Yugoslav Railways, backed by the SKH, that Serbian Ekavian spelling ought to be supplemented with Croatian Ijekavian spelling in all official notices and schedules.

While multiple newspapers and magazines supported Matica hrvatska, the organisation also introduced its own organ, Hrvatski tjednik (Croatian Weekly), which enthusiastically promoted Croatian nationalism. Edited by Vlado Gotovac, it quickly surpassed the number of subscribers of all other newspapers including Vjesnik, the newspaper of record in Croatia.

=== SKH factions ===
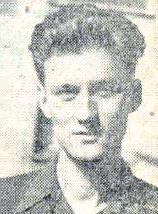
Miko Tripalo was one of the leaders of the reformist faction of the League of Communists of Croatia.

Initially, the SKH was internally divided over support for Matica hrvatska, and its leadership remained mostly silent on the matter. The party was led by a reformist faction consisting of SKH Secretary of the Central Committee Savka Dabčević-Kučar and Miko Tripalo, supported by Pero Pirker, Dragutin Haramija, Ivan Šibl, and others. Dabčević-Kučar, Tripalo and Pirker assumed the top positions in the SKH in 1969 with Bakarić's support. The reformists were opposed by a conservative or anti-reformist faction including Žanko and Stipe Šuvar, Dušan Dragosavac, Jure Bilić, and Milutin Baltić. In search of support, the conservative faction allied with the Praxis School. Dabčević-Kučar and Tripalo, on the other hand, found support in SKH ranks closer to or associated with Matica hrvatska such as Đodan and Marko Veselica. In late 1969, Žanko also criticised the SKH leadership as well as Bakarić, accusing them of nationalism and anti-socialist attitudes in an article for Borba. He also wrote a series of articles denouncing Vjesnik, Radio Television Zagreb, and literary magazine Hrvatski književni list and Bruno Bušić as a writer contributing to the magazine. Others accused by Žanko of stirring up nationalist views were writers Šegedin, Gotovac, and Tomislav Ladan; literary critics Vlatko Pavletić, Igor Mandić and Branimir Donat; Vjesnik u srijedu weekly editor Krešimir Džeba and Vjesnik political columnist Neda Krmpotić; editor of Roman Catholic Archdiocese of Zagreb-published weekly Glas Koncila Živko Kustić, historian Trpimir Macan, art historian Grgo Gamulin, as well as economists Đodan, Hrvoje Šošić, Marko and Vladimir Veselica. On 19 December, Tito criticised Žanko's actions. In January 1970, Dabčević-Kučar accused Žanko of unitarism and of trying to topple the SKH leadership. Žanko was removed from all political functions and the SKH moved closer to Matica hrvatska's positions. Some sources, including Perović, mark Žanko's dismissal as the beginning of the Croatian Spring.

Throughout, the SKH's central economic demand was that Croatia be permitted to retain more of its foreign currency earnings. To this end, the SKH maintained good relations with counterparts from Slovenia and Macedonia, and also attempted to secure the support of the League of Communists of Kosovo. Due to its rejection of the SKH's economic agenda, the SKS was dismissed as "unionist" by the SKH despite Nikezić's support for other reforms. The SKH also opposed the under-representation of Croats in the police, security forces, and the military, as well as in political and economic institutions in Croatia as well as across Yugoslavia. The predominance of Serbs in these positions led to widespread calls for their replacement by Croats. At the federal level, Serbs represented about 39 percent of the Yugoslav population, while Croats accounted for about 19 percent. Serbs were over-represented and Croats under-represented in the civil service by a factor of two, accounting for 67 percent and nine percent of civil servants, respectively. Similarly, Serbs made up 60–70 percent of the officer corps of the Yugoslav People's Army (JNA). In Croatia alone, Serbs represented about 15 percent of the population, but accounted for nearly one-quarter of the SKH's members and more than one-half of the police force.

=== SKH involvement until mid-1971 ===
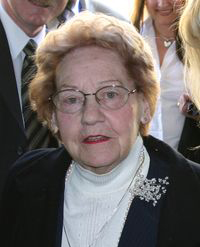
Savka Dabčević-Kučar, one of the most prominent Croatian Spring participants and the head of the League of Communists of Croatia in 1969–1971.

In December 1970, the SKH candidate lost the election of student pro-rector of the Zagreb University to an independent, Ivan Zvonimir Čičak. Non-communist candidates took over the remaining student organisations headquartered in Zagreb in April 1971. Dražen Budiša was elected the head of the Zagreb Student Federation, and Ante Paradžik became the head of the Croatian Student Federation.

Within days of the student-body elections, Tito requested that Dabčević-Kučar order the arrests of Šegedin, Marko Veselica, Budiša, Čičak and Đodan, but she declined. This decision made Dabčević-Kučar very popular in Croatia. At a rally of 200,000 people to mark the 26th anniversary of the 1945 liberation of Zagreb on 7 May, observers from the United States reported that her speech was interrupted about 40 times by cheering and applause directed at her rather than the SKH. According to the British ambassador to Yugoslavia Dugald Stewart, Dabčević-Kučar and Tripalo were very skilled at use of public political rallies and their speeches drew crowds typically expected only at football matches.

Another set of amendments to the Yugoslav constitution was adopted further restricting federal powers in June 1971. The only powers retained by the federal government were foreign affairs, foreign trade, defence, common currency, and common tariffs. Inter-republic committees were set up to make decisions by the federal government before ratification. The SKH wanted further decentralisation in 1971 to include banking and foreign trade, and changes that would allow Croatia to retain more foreign currency earnings. Other demands were coming from outside the SKH Central Committee, ranging from establishing a Croatian military to complete independence. Ultimately the Croatian Spring involved a wide variety of elements including anti-centralists, moderate and extreme nationalists, pro-Ustaše, anti-communists, reformists, democrats and democratic socialists, liberals, and libertarians.

The SKS leadership did not criticise the SKH; on the contrary, Nikezić and Perović defended Croatia's reformist leadership to Tito in 1971. Serbian and Croatian newspapers traded accusations of mutual hostility, nationalism, and unitarism, leading Tito to admit that the SKJ had lost control of the media. In a meeting with the SKH leaders in July 1971, Tito expressed concern with the political situation and offered Tripalo the post of Prime Minister of Yugoslavia to move him away from the SKH, but Tripalo declined. Later that month, the conservative faction managed to gain sufficient support to expel Đodan and Marko Veselica from the SKH as "nationalist ringleaders".

On 2 August, the SKH announced an Action Programme, criticising nationalism which was referred to in the programme as "national movement", and denouncing unnamed individuals associated with Matica hrvatska for conspiring against the SKH and the SKJ. The SKH leaders determined that the Action Programme would be formally adopted or rejected by its next plenary session in November. The SKH arranged another meeting with Tito on 14 September, insisting he had been misinformed about the situation. After the meeting, Tito said he was convinced that the stories about chauvinism reigning in Croatia were absurd. He also implied that he favoured the SKH's proposal to reform Yugoslavia's foreign currency policy. After the meeting, Tripalo suggested that the Action Programme would no longer be considered.

=== Looking for role models from the past ===
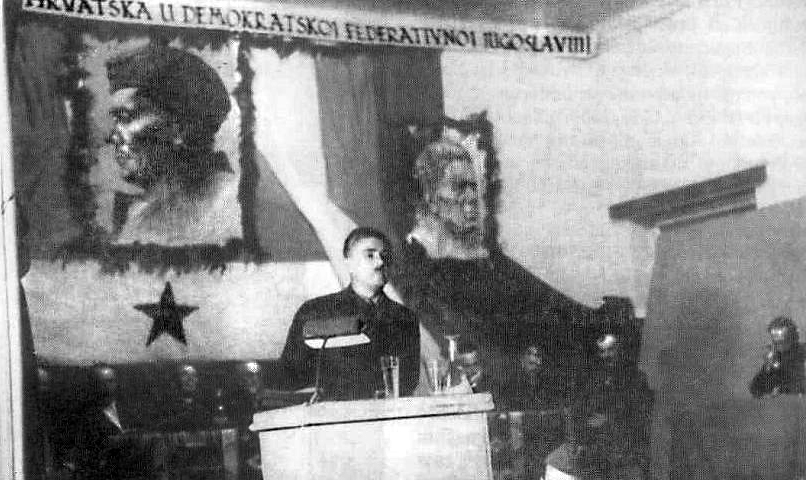
The federal model adopted by the ZAVNOH (Andrija Hebrang shown speaking at its third session) was the declared aim of the Croatian leadership during the Croatian Spring.

The Croatian Spring spurred increased interest in Croatian historical figures. A commemorative plaque to Stjepan Radić, the founder of the Croatian Peasant Party (HSS) and a champion of the Croatian cause in pre-war Yugoslavia, was put up in Zagreb, followed by a monument to him in the town of Metković. The city of Šibenik cancelled a plan to erect a monument to the victims of fascism, instead erecting a statue of the medieval Croatian king Peter Krešimir IV. A marching band and a living history troop named after the 18th-century Trenck's Pandurs were re-established in Požega in 1969. There were also unsuccessful calls to restore a monument to the 19th-century Ban of Croatia Josip Jelačić, which had been removed from Zagreb's central square by the SKH in 1947.

Traditional Croatian patriotic songs—some of them banned—experienced a resurgence in popularity. The most popular and controversial singer of such songs at the time was Vice Vukov. Lijepa naša domovino returned to formal use as a patriotic song when a plaque was placed in the Zagreb Cathedral commemorating the noblemen involved in the 17th-century Magnate conspiracy. The opera Nikola Šubić Zrinski, retelling the 16th-century Siege of Szigetvár, was regularly sold out whenever it played at the Croatian National Theatre in Zagreb. Paintings by Oton Iveković (1869–1939) depicting events from Croatian history became very popular. Croatia's historical chequy coat of arms became a famous symbol sewn by youths on jackets and berets or applied on stickers to car windshields. In 1969, it was incorporated into the football club crest of Dinamo Zagreb. While the Yugoslav flag was still flown, it was always paired with the Croatian one. The latter was also used on its own, and in overall use in Croatia, it outnumbered the Yugoslav flag by ten to one.

The SKH pointed out the significance of the Catholic Church in Croatian culture and political identity. Dabčević-Kučar later said that the move was motivated by her wish to counterbalance the Serbian Orthodox Church as a "source of Serbian chauvinism". While the Catholic Church did not play an important role in the Croatian Spring, it contributed to the strengthening of national identity by introducing the Cult of Mary as a Croatian national symbol around the same time. This contribution was reinforced by the canonisation of the 14th-century Croatian Franciscan friar and missionary Nicholas Tavelic in 1970.

The SKH maintained that its current policy was rooted in the Partisan legacy, arguing that the Yugoslav federation was not set up as envisaged by the World War II-era State Anti-fascist Council for the National Liberation of Croatia (ZAVNOH); in particular, ZAVNOH's solution to the Croatian question was not implemented. The SKH said that national sentiments were a legitimate expression of interests which communists must defend and that Yugoslavia must be organised as a community of national sovereign republics. Hrvatski tjednik published an article by Tuđman praising ZAVNOH. Its cover page carried a photo of the wartime secretary of the Communist Party of Croatia, Andrija Hebrang, whom the SKJ had considered a Soviet spy and a traitor since the 1948 Tito–Stalin split. The article also coincided with a request, ignored by the SKH, to posthumously rehabilitate Hebrang. The initiative was launched as a form of "moral rehabilitation" by anti-communist émigrés including former high-ranking KPJ official Ante Ciliga.

=== Demands for autonomy and a new constitution ===
At the time of the Croatian Spring, civic relations between Croats and Serbs in Croatia were increasingly framed by diverging narratives of World War I and especially World War II. While Croats focused on the role of the Royal Serbian Army in the creation of the Serb-dominated Kingdom of Yugoslavia, and killings of collaborationist Ustaše troops and their sympathisers in the 1945 Yugoslav pursuit of Nazi collaborators, Serbs negatively evaluated the Croatian participation in Austria-Hungary's Serbian campaign during World War I, and especially the genocide of Serbs committed by the Ustaše in the Axis puppet state known as the Independent State of Croatia (NDH). In a series of articles in Hrvatski tjednik, Tuđman expressed the view of the majority of the SKH as well as Matica hrvatska: that Croats had made a significant contribution to the Partisan struggle and were not collectively to blame for Ustaše atrocities.

Among Croatian Serbs, Serbian nationalism flared in response to the Croatian national resurgence. By 1969, the cultural society Prosvjeta came to the forefront of Croatian Serb nationalist discourse. A plan put forward by SKH reformists to revise elementary and middle school literature and history curricula so 75 per cent of the coverage would be on Croatian topics drew complaints from Prosvjeta, which argued that the plan was a threat to Serb cultural rights. Prosvjeta also objected to the SKH's attempts to reinterpret the wartime Partisan struggle as a liberation of Croatian nationality within the Yugoslav framework. By 1971, Prosvjeta demanded that the Serbian language and Cyrillic script be officially used in Croatia alongside the Croatian language and Latin script, as well as legislative safeguards guaranteeing the national equality of Serbs. Prosvjeta rejected the federal model advocated by the ZAVNOH and the SKH, arguing that nationalism was no longer needed in Yugoslavia. Furthermore, Prosvjeta denounced the work of Matica hrvatska and asserted that the Serbs of Croatia would preserve their national identity by relying on Serbia's help regardless of the borders of the republics.

Finally, Prosvjeta's Rade Bulat demanded the establishment of an autonomous province for the Croatian Serbs, and there were calls to grant autonomy for Dalmatia as well. The SKH Central Committee declared that no region of Croatia could make any legitimate claim to autonomy of any kind and labelled calls for regional Dalmatian autonomy as treason to the Croatian nation. Such responses aligned with the SKH's objective of national homogenisation. To that end, the SKH blocked the option of declaring one's ethnic identity as regional in the 1971 census. The campaign led by Matica hrvatska to emphasise the distinction between Croatian and Serbian was reflected in the prevailing speech of Croatian Serbs, which changed from predominantly Ijekavian, or an Ekavian-Ijekavian blend, to predominantly Ekavian.

The Serbian philosopher Mihailo Đurić argued that Croatia's constitution should be amended to describe the republic as the national state of Croats and Serbs. This remark sparked another series of public debates in March 1971 in the context of the constitutional reform of Yugoslavia. The SKJ responded by bringing charges against Đurić and imprisoning him. Matica hrvatska proposed an amendment to the constitution, further emphasising the national character of Croatia. The SKH dismissed the proposal and drafted its own wording, arguing it was a compromise. Ultimately passed, the SKH's amendment mentioned the Croatian Serbs specifically but defined Croatia as a "national state" of the Croats, avoiding use of the exact same phrase for the Croatian Serbs. (Note: The amendment defined the Socialist Republic of Croatia as "the national state of the Croatian nation, the state of the Serbian nation in Croatia, and state of the nationalities inhabiting it.") The meaning of this difference in formulations was not explained in the text of the constitution. By mid-September 1971, ethnic tensions had worsened to the point that in northern Dalmatia, some Serb and Croat villagers took up arms in fear of each other.

=== Outside Croatia ===
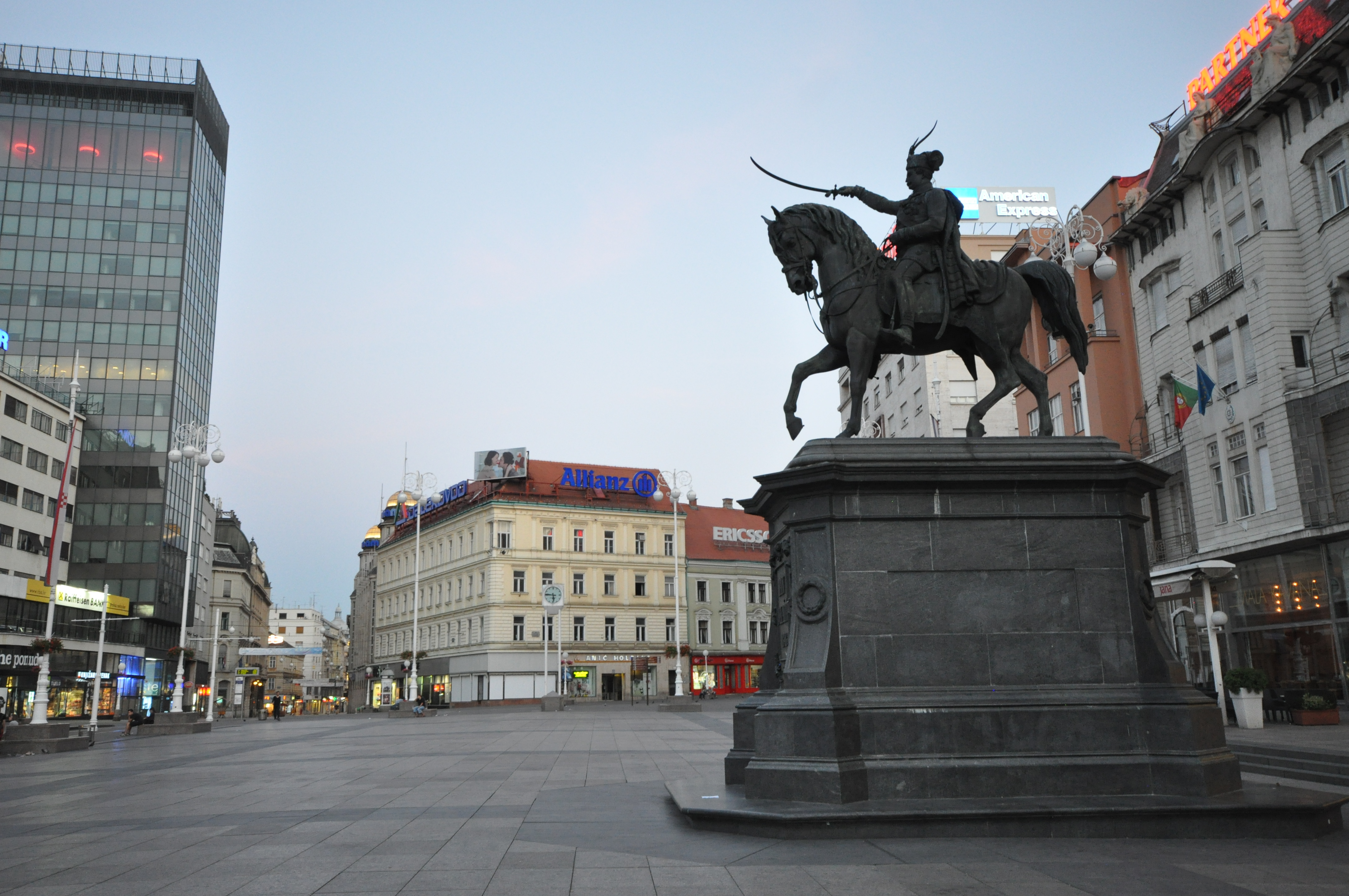
An unsuccessful attempt was made during the Croatian Spring to restore the monument to Josip Jelačić to Zagreb's central square.

In February 1971, the Croatian nationalist émigré magazine Hrvatska država, printed by Branimir Jelić in West Berlin, published a story attributed to its Moscow correspondent claiming that the Warsaw Pact would help Croatia achieve its independence, granting it a status comparable to that enjoyed by Finland at the time. The article also stated that the SKH was collaborating with Ustaše émigrés. The Yugoslav Military Mission in Berlin reported the story to the military intelligence service along with the names of alleged Ustaše émigré operatives in Croatia. The report was initially believed, leading the Yugoslav authorities to become concerned that the Soviet Union might be instigating and aiding the SKH and the Ustaše émigrés. A federal investigation concluded on 7 April that the story was false, and the authorities decided to bury the affair. Immediately, the SKH announced that foreign and domestic enemies of the SKH stood behind the allegations. The same day, Vladimir Rolović, the Yugoslav ambassador to Sweden, was mortally wounded in an unrelated attack by Ustaše émigrés, further escalating tensions. According to Dabčević-Kučar, the SKH leadership treated the enthusiasm of the émigrés with suspicion, believing it to be linked with the Yugoslav State Security Administration, and also because their activity weakened the SKH's position.

Even though the leadership of Bosnia and Herzegovina was cautious in its response to the SKH's January 1970 shift towards Matica hrvatska's positions, relations became much tenser, primarily reflected through texts published by Matica hrvatska journals and Oslobođenje, the newspaper of record in Bosnia and Herzegovina. The leadership of Bosnia and Herzegovina initially distinguished between the positions of the SKH and those held by Matica hrvatska, but this distinction eroded over time. In September, Matica hrvatska expanded its work to Bosnia and Herzegovina and the Serbian autonomous province of Vojvodina, claiming Croats were underrepresented in government institutions there due to policies implemented during Ranković's tenure. By November 1971, Croatian nationalists advocated annexing a part of Bosnia and Herzegovina to Croatia to rectify the situation. In response, Serbian nationalists claimed other parts of Bosnia and Herzegovina for Serbia. Officials from Bosnia and Herzegovina responded by prohibiting the establishment of Matica hrvatska branches within the republic.

=== Foreign policy considerations ===
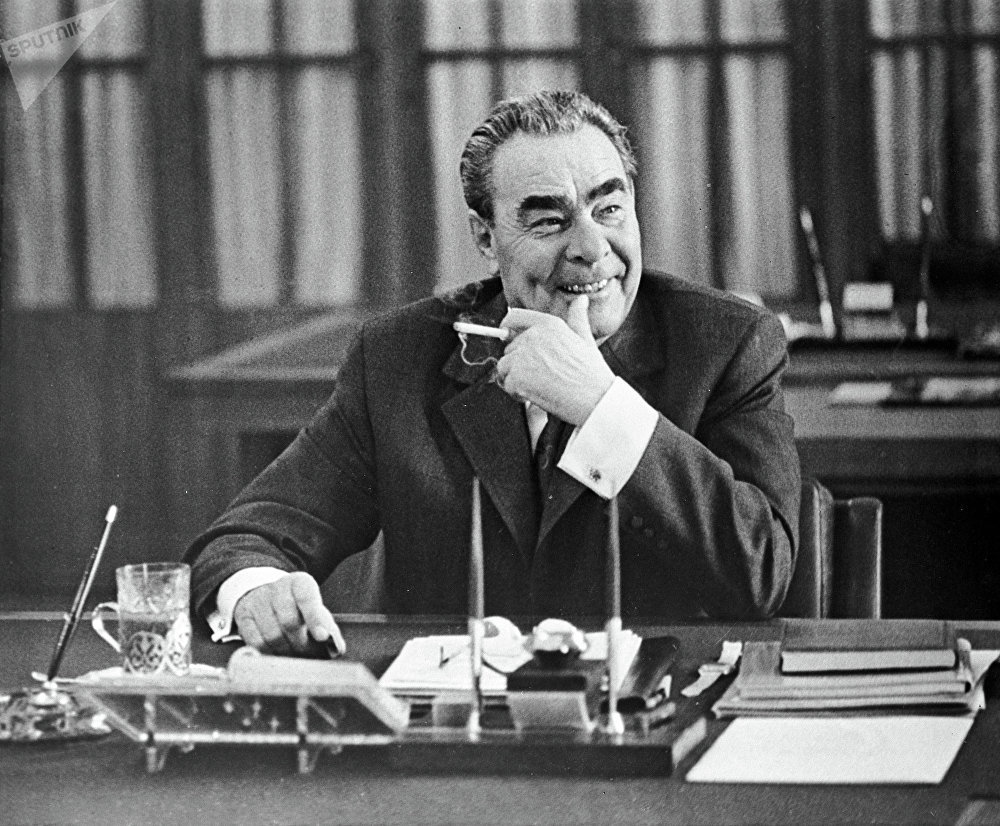
Leonid Brezhnev offered Josip Broz Tito Soviet assistance in 1970.

During a meeting of the SKJ leadership at the Brijuni Islands on 28–30 April 1971, Tito received a telephone call from Soviet leader Leonid Brezhnev. According to Tito, Brezhnev offered help to resolve the political crisis in Yugoslavia, and Tito declined. The offer was likened by the SKH and by Tito to Brezhnev's call to the First Secretary of the Communist Party of Czechoslovakia Alexander Dubček in 1968 ahead of the Warsaw Pact invasion of Czechoslovakia—as being a threat of imminent Warsaw Pact invasion. Some members of the SKH Central Committee suggested that Tito invented it to strengthen his position, but the First Deputy Premier of the Soviet Union Dmitry Polyansky confirmed the conversation took place.

Aiming to improve the United States' position in the Mediterranean area following the Black September crisis in Jordan, the United States President Richard Nixon toured several countries in the region. Nixon's state visit to Yugoslavia lasted from 30 September until 2 October 1970 and included a trip to Zagreb, where Nixon sparked controversy in a toast at the Banski dvori, the seat of the Croatian government. His toast ended with the words "Long live Croatia! Long live Yugoslavia!", which were interpreted variously as a show of support for the independence of Croatia, or alternatively as just a common courtesy. The Yugoslav ambassador to the United States interpreted the episode as strategic positioning for a breakup of Yugoslavia.

Brezhnev visited Yugoslavia from 22 to 25 September 1971 amid continuing tension between Yugoslavia and the Soviet Union following the 1968 invasion of Czechoslovakia. Brezhnev offered a friendship agreement, but Tito declined to sign it to avoid appearing to move closer to the Eastern Bloc. Yugoslav officials notified Nixon through Secretary of State William P. Rogers that the meeting with Brezhnev did not go well. An official visit of Tito to the United States was arranged to reassure Tito of the United States' political, economic, and military support for Yugoslavia. Nixon and Tito met on 30 October in Washington, D.C.

== Suppression and purges ==
=== November plenum and student protest ===
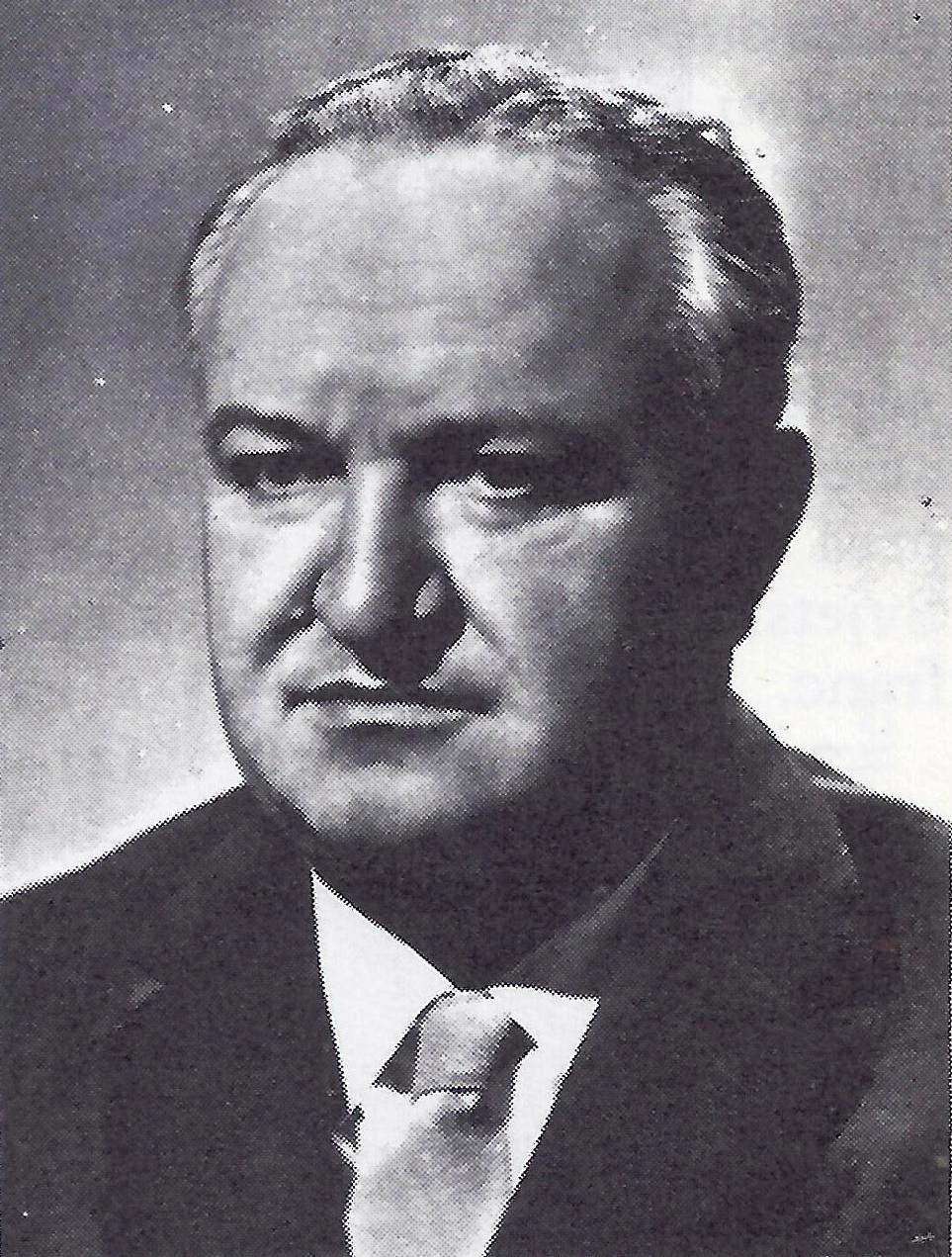
Vladimir Bakarić helped replace the reformist leaders of Croatia.

At the 5 November plenary session of the SKH, Dabčević-Kučar said that the national movement was evidence of the unity of the nation and the SKH, which she said should not be sacrificed to achieve revolutionary purity. After she rejected several of Bakarić's proposals to modify the SKH's policies, the conservative faction—most vocally Bilić and Dragosavac—demanded the enforcement of the August Action Programme. The issue was not resolved by the plenum but, in the aftermath of the session, Bakarić decided to support Bilić and Dragosavac and to ask Tito to intervene. On 12–15 November, Tito visited Bugojno in Bosnia and Herzegovina, where he was hosted by the republic's leadership (Branko Mikulić, Hamdija Pozderac, and Dragutin Kosovac). On 13 November, they were joined by the Yugoslav prime minister, Džemal Bijedić, who criticised the SKH's demands for changing the distribution of foreign currency earnings. Dragosavac met with Tito on 14 and 15 November to discuss the Croatian Spring. On 15 November, Tito was joined by the heads of the JNA to view recordings of political rallies in Croatia where nationalists and SKH members spoke and where anti-Tito shouts could be heard.

The extended SKH Central Committee secretly met from 17 to 23 November, but the two opposing factions could not agree. On 22 November, about 3,000 Zagreb University students voted to begin a strike the next morning. Initially, they protested federal regulations on hard currency, banking and commerce. At Paradžik's urging, a series of proposed constitutional amendments was added to the demands: defining Croatia as a sovereign and national state of Croats, making Croatian the official language, guaranteeing that residents of Croatia would complete their compulsory military service in Croatia, and formally establishing Zagreb as Croatia's capital and Lijepa naša domovino as the anthem of Croatia. The protesters singled out Bakarić for sabotaging Tripalo's currency reform. The Croatian Student Federation expanded the strike over Croatia. Within days, 30,000 students were on strike demanding the expulsion of Bilić, Dragosavac, Baltić, Ema Derossi-Bjelajac and Čedo Grbić from the SKH as unitarists. On 25 November, Tripalo met with the students, urging them to stop the strike, and Dabčević-Kučar made the same request four days later.

=== Karađorđevo meeting and the purges ===
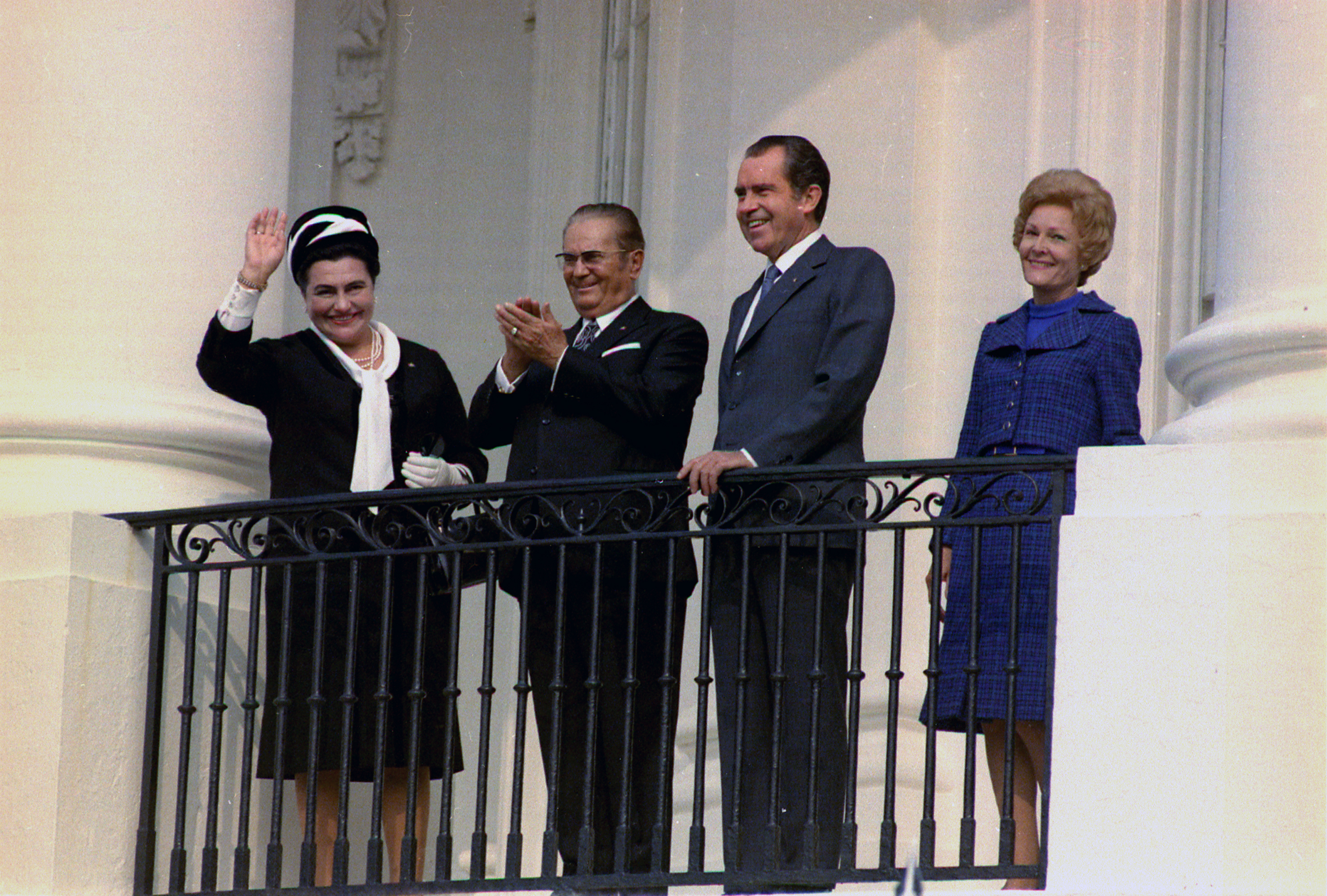
Josip Broz Tito (shown meeting Richard Nixon in 1971) convened the meeting of the League of Communists of Yugoslavia in Karađorđevo to deal with the crisis in Croatia.

Tito contacted the United States to inform them of his plan to remove the reformist leadership of Croatia, and the United States did not object. Tito considered deploying the JNA but opted for a political campaign instead. On 1 December, Tito convened a joint meeting of the SKJ and the SKH leaders at the Karađorđevo hunting ground in Vojvodina. SKH conservatives first criticised the SKH leadership, asking for stern action against nationalism. SKJ presidium members from other republics and provinces then gave speeches supporting the conservative stance, and the SKH leadership was told to control the situation in Croatia. Tito particularly criticised Matica hrvatska, accusing it of being a political party and attempting to establish a fascist state similar to the NDH. The next day, after the Karađorđevo meeting, Tito's speech was broadcast to all of Yugoslavia, warning of the threat of counter-revolution.

After the broadcast, the student strike was called off and the SKH leadership announced their agreement with Tito. On 6 December, Bakarić criticised the SKH leadership for not taking any practical steps to comply with Tito's speech of two days earlier, especially for not taking action against Matica hrvatska. Bakarić accused Tripalo of attempting to split the SKH by exaggerating the popular support for the reformists. Two days later, the SKJ leadership met again and concluded that the SKH was not implementing the decisions adopted in Karađorđevo. Student strike leaders were arrested on 11 December, and Dabčević-Kučar and Pirker were forced to resign by Tito the next day. At that point, Tripalo, Marko Koprtla and Janko Bobetko immediately also resigned. In the following days, more resignations were tendered, including the head of the government, Haramija. Milka Planinc became the head of the SKH. Five hundred students protested in Zagreb against the resignations and were suppressed by riot police.

Subsequently, tens of thousands were expelled from the SKH, including 741 high-ranking officials such as Dabčević-Kučar, Tripalo, and Pirker. Another 280 SKH members were compelled to resign their posts and 131 were demoted. SKH conservatives demanded a major show trial with Tuđman as the main defendant, but Tito blocked this proposal. Instead, Tuđman was convicted of trying to overthrow the "democratic self-managing socialism". Overall, 200–300 people were convicted of political crimes, but thousands more were imprisoned without formal charges for two to three months. Matica hrvatska and Prosvjeta were banned, including the former's fourteen publications. Purges targeting media professionals, writers, filmmakers, and university staff continued until late 1972. Even though the purges took place only in the period after the 1 December 1971 Karađorđevo meeting, this date is usually thought of as the end of the Croatian Spring in commemorations of the events. Authorities seized and destroyed 40,000 copies of the Moguš, Finka & Babić orthography manual as chauvinist. The remaining 600 copies were bound without any foreword or index and marked "for internal use only". This version was reprinted by London-based Croatian émigré magazine Nova Hrvatska (New Croatia) in 1972 and 1984. The book was published again in Croatia in 1990.

== Aftermath ==
=== Maintenance of reforms ===
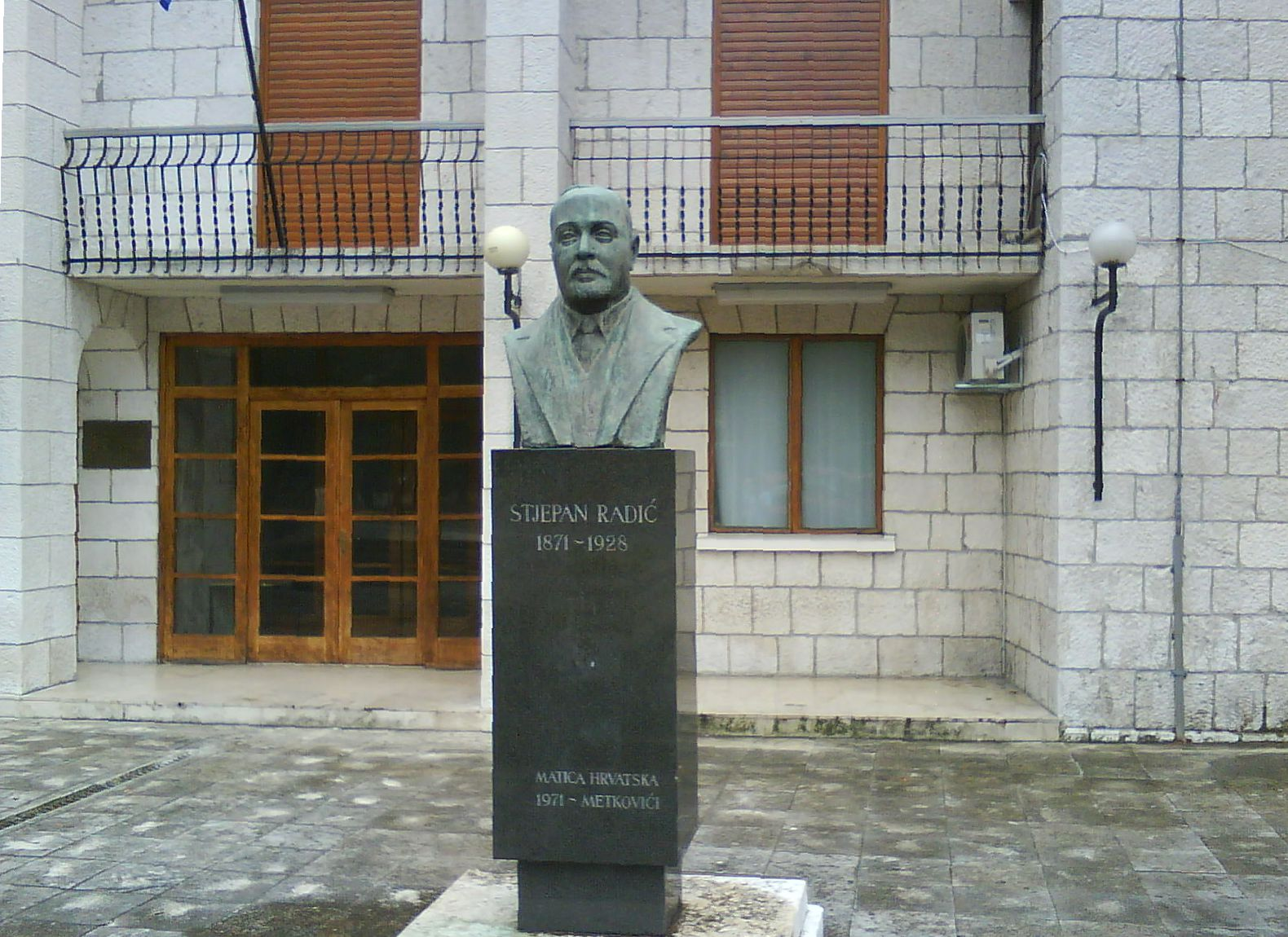
A monument to interwar Croatian Peasant Party leader Stjepan Radić was erected in Metković during the Croatian Spring.

Under the new SKH leadership, Ivo Perišin replaced Haramija as the President of its Executive Council in late December 1971. In February 1972, the Croatian Parliament passed a series of 36 amendments to the Constitution of the Socialist Republic of Croatia, one of which introduced Lijepa naša domovino as the republic's anthem.

After the downfall of the reformist SKH leadership, anti-communist émigrés wrote about the Croatian Spring as a movement presaging democratisation and praised Dabčević-Kučar and Tripalo as people of "unusual political virtues". Some émigrés believed that the political situation in Yugoslavia, especially among Croats, was conducive to an uprising. Consequently, nineteen members of the Croatian Revolutionary Brotherhood terrorist organisation launched an armed incursion into Yugoslavia in mid-1972, hoping to incite a rebellion that would lead to the re-establishment of the NDH. After a month of deadly skirmishes with the authorities, the incursion ended in failure.

Pirker died in August 1972, and his funeral drew 100,000 supporters. The size of the crowd attending the funeral confirmed continued broad support for Dabčević-Kučar and Tripalo, irrespective of their recent purge.

To reduce the popular support for the Croatian nationalists, Tito granted many of the demands of the ousted SKH leaders. For example, export companies were allowed to retain 20 per cent of foreign exchange earnings instead of 7–12 percent while tourism companies increased their retention of foreign currency earnings from 12 per cent to 45 per cent. Devaluation of the Yugoslav dinar by 18.7 per cent, increased the value of the retained foreign currency income on the domestic market.

The new SKH leadership was unwilling to undo the changes implemented by their predecessors and subsequently lost support from the Croatian Serbs. Some Serbs called for the constitution of Croatia to be amended to redefine Croatia as a national state of both Croats and Serbs and create a Serb committee in the Sabor. Those ideas were defeated by Grbić, who held the position of deputy speaker of the Croatian Parliament; as a result, Serbian nationalists denounced Grbić as a traitor to their cause.

The 1974 Yugoslav Constitution preserved the 1971 reforms almost entirely, expanded the economic powers of the constituent republics, and granted reformist demands related to banking, commerce, and foreign currency.

=== Legacy in the final decades of Yugoslavia ===
In the aftermath of the 1971 purge, the authorities began to pejoratively refer to the events that had transpired as the Maspok, a blend word of masovni pokret meaning 'mass movement', as a reference to the politicisation of the masses to ensure the involvement of actors beyond the SKH in Croatia's politics. The term Croatian Spring was coined retroactively, after the 1971 purges, by those holding a more favourable view of the events. The latter term was not permitted to be publicly used in Yugoslavia until 1989.

The end of the Croatian Spring ushered in a period known as the Croatian Silence (Hrvatska šutnja), (Note: Also referred to as the "silent Croatia" in English sources.) which lasted until the late 1980s, during which the public kept its distance from the unpopular imposed authorities. Discussion about the position of the Croatian Serbs was avoided by the new Croatian leadership, and Grbić and others became concerned that the question would be left to the Serbian Orthodox Church and nationalists from Serbia to pose solutions without any counterargument.

The Croatian Spring was a significant event for all of Yugoslavia. Reformist factions in the SKS, SKM and the League of Communists of Slovenia were also suppressed by the end of 1972, replaced by mediocre and obedient politicians. During this period, pressure for the complete breakup of Yugoslavia intensified, religious leaders gained influence, and the Partisan legacy that legitimised the state was weakened. The purges of the 1970s in Croatia and elsewhere in Yugoslavia drove many reformist communists and supporters of social democracy away from politics in the country's final decades.

From 1989, several people previously involved with the SKH or Matica hrvatska during the Croatian Spring returned to Croatian politics. Budiša and Gotovac had leading roles in the Croatian Social Liberal Party (HSLS), which was formed before the 1990 Croatian parliamentary election. Čičak was prominent in the HSS. In January 1989, Marko and Vladimir Veselica, Tuđman, Šošić, and Ladan launched an initiative to found the Croatian Democratic Union (HDZ). Dissatisfied with Tuđman's election to lead the HDZ, the Veselica brothers left, and formed the Croatian Democratic Party (HDS) in November. The HDZ gained Stjepan Mesić, another SKH official ousted after the Croatian Spring. Dabčević-Kučar, Tripalo, and Haramija formed the Coalition of People's Accord coalition as independents, supported by several parties, including the HSLS and HDS. The HDZ won the elections, Tuđman became the President of the Presidency (later President) and Mesić became the President of the Executive Council (later referred to as Prime Minister).

== See also ==
- Zadar school shooting

== Sources ==
- "Babić – Finka – Moguš: Hrvatski pravopis, 1971. (londonac)" [Babić – Finka – Moguš: Croatian Orthography, 1971 (The Londoner)] (in Croatian). Zagreb: Institut za hrvatski jezik i jezikoslovlje. Archived from the original on 29 July 2020.
- Banac, Ivo (1992). "Yugoslavia". The American Historical Review. 97 (4). Oxford: Oxford University Press on behalf of the American Historical Association: 1084–1104. doi:10.2307/2165494. ISSN 0002-8762. JSTOR 2165494.
- Batović, Ante (2010). "Od ekonomske reforme do Brijunskog plenuma – Američki i britanski izvještaji o Hrvatskoj (1964–1966)" [From Economic Reform to Brijuni Plenum – American and British Reports on Croatia (1964–1966)]. Historijski zbornik (in Croatian). 63 (2). Zagreb: Društvo za hrvatsku povjesnicu: 539–569. ISSN 0351-2193.
- Batović, Ante (2017). The Croatian Spring: Nationalism, Repression and Foreign Policy Under Tito. London: I. B. Tauris. ISBN 978-1-78453-927-6.
- Bing, Albert (2012). "Hrvatsko proljeće (Miko Tripalo i Ivan Supek) i vrijeme promjena: Kontinuitet demokratske evolucije hrvatske politike na prijelazu osamdesetih u devedesete godine 20. stoljeća" [Croatian Spring (Miko Tripalo and Ivan Supek) and the Time of Changes: Continuity of Democratic Evolution of Croatian Politics at the Turn of the Eighties and the Nineties of the 20th Century]. In Jakovina, Tvrtko (ed.). Hrvatsko proljeće 40 godina poslije [Croatian Spring 40 Years Later] (in Croatian). Zagreb: Centar za demokraciju i pravo Miko Tripalo. pp. 353–384. ISBN 978-953-56875-1-1.
- Budimir, Davorka (2010). "Hrvatska politička elita na početku demokratske tranzicije" [The Croatian Political Elite at the Beginning of the Democratic Transition]. Anali Hrvatskog politološkog društva: časopis za politologiju (in Croatian). 7 (1). Zagreb: Croatian Political Science Association: 73–97. ISSN 1845-6707.
- Bukvić, Nenad (2013). "Izvršno vijeće Sabora Socijalističke Republike Hrvatske: ustroj i djelovanje (1963–1974)" [Executive Council of Parliament of Socialist Republic of Croatia: Organization and Activity (1963–1974)]. Arhivski vjesnik (in Croatian). 56 (1). Zagreb: Croatian State Archives: 45–72. ISSN 0570-9008.
- Dean, Robert W. (1976). "Civil-Military Relations in Yugoslavia, 1971–1975". Armed Forces & Society. 3 (1). Thousand Oaks: SAGE Publications: 17–58. doi:10.1177/0095327X7600300103. ISSN 0095-327X. JSTOR 45345995. S2CID 145174378.
- Dyker, David A.; Vejvoda, Ivan (2014). Yugoslavia and After: A Study in Fragmentation, Despair and Rebirth. Abingdon-on-Thames: Routledge. ISBN 978-1-317-89135-2.
- Fichter, Madigan (2016). "Student Rebellion in Belgrade, Zagreb, and Sarajevo in 1968". Slavic Review. 75 (1). Oxford: Cambridge University Press for the Association for Slavic, East European, and Eurasian Studies: 99–121. doi:10.5612/slavicreview.75.1.99. ISSN 0037-6779. JSTOR 10.5612/slavicreview.75.1.99. S2CID 163841028.
- Flere, Sergej; Rutar, Tibor (2019). "The Segmentation of the Yugoslav Communist Elite, 1943–1972". Družboslovne razprave. 35 (92). Ljubljana: Slovensko sociološko društvo: 81–101. ISSN 0352-3608.
- Grbić, Srđan (2012). "Čedo Grbić o hrvatskom proljeću: Prilog o ideologiji jednog vremena" [Čedo Grbić on the Croatian Spring: Review of Ideology of a Period]. In Jakovina, Tvrtko (ed.). Hrvatsko proljeće 40 godina poslije [Croatian Spring 40 Years Later] (in Croatian). Zagreb: Centar za demokraciju i pravo Miko Tripalo. pp. 343–352. ISBN 978-953-56875-1-1.
- Haug, Hilde Katrine (2012). Creating a Socialist Yugoslavia: Tito, Communist Leadership and the National Question. London: Bloomsbury Publishing. ISBN 978-0-85772-121-1.
- Irvine, Jill (2007). "The Croatian Spring and the Dissolution of Yugoslavia". In Cohen, Lenard J.; Dragović-Soso, Jasna (eds.). State Collapse in South-Eastern Europe: New Perspectives on Yugoslavia's Disintegration. West Lafayette: Purdue University Press. pp. 149–178. ISBN 978-1-55753-460-6.
- Jakovina, Tvrtko (1999). "Što je značio Nixonov usklik "Živjela Hrvatska"?" [What Did Nixon's Exclamation "Long Live Croatia" Mean?]. Društvena istraživanja: časopis za opća društvena pitanja (in Croatian). 8 (2–3). Zagreb: Institute of Social Sciences Ivo Pilar: 347–371. ISSN 1330-0288.
- Jakovina, Tvrtko (2012). "Mozaik hrvatskoga reformskog pokreta 1971." [1971 Croatian Reform Movement Mosaic]. In Jakovina, Tvrtko (ed.). Hrvatsko proljeće 40 godina poslije [Croatian Spring 40 Years Later] (in Croatian). Zagreb: Centar za demokraciju i pravo Miko Tripalo. pp. 385–427. ISBN 978-953-56875-1-1.
- Kamberović, Husnija (2012). "Percepcija hrvatskog proljeća u Bosni i Hercegovini" [Perception of the Croatian Spring in Bosnia and Herzegovina]. In Jakovina, Tvrtko (ed.). Hrvatsko proljeće 40 godina poslije [Croatian Spring 40 Years Later] (in Croatian). Zagreb: Centar za demokraciju i pravo Miko Tripalo. pp. 127–148. ISBN 978-953-56875-1-1.
- Knezović, Marin (1995). "Štrajk hrvatskih sveučilištaraca u jesen 1971. u onodobnom tisku" [Autumn 1971 Strike of Croatian University Students in the Press of the Period]. Radovi: Radovi Zavoda za hrvatsku povijest Filozofskoga fakulteta Sveučilišta u Zagrebu (in Croatian). 28 (1). Zagreb: Croatian Institute of History: 230–241. ISSN 0353-295X.
- Kullaa, Rinna (2012). "US Intelligence Estimates of the "Crises in Croatia" and its Relationship to Détente in East–West Relationships Across Europe 1971–1972". In Jakovina, Tvrtko (ed.). Hrvatsko proljeće 40 godina poslije [Croatian Spring 40 Years Later]. Zagreb: Centar za demokraciju i pravo Miko Tripalo. pp. 93–110. ISBN 978-953-56875-1-1.
- Kursar, Tonči (2006). "Prijeporni pluralizam 1971" [Contentious Pluralism of 1971]. Politička misao: Časopis za politologiju (in Croatian). 43 (4). Zagreb: University of Zagreb, Faculty of Political Science: 143–155. ISSN 0032-3241.
- Lampe, John R. (2000). Yugoslavia as History: Twice There Was a Country (2nd ed.). Cambridge: Cambridge University Press. ISBN 978-0-521-77357-7.
- Mićanović, Krešimir (2012). "Jezična politika s kraja 60-ih i s početka 70-ih: U procijepu između autonomije i centralizma" [Language Policy in Late 1960s and Early 1970s: Caught Between Autonomy and Centralism]. In Jakovina, Tvrtko (ed.). Hrvatsko proljeće 40 godina poslije [Croatian Spring 40 Years Later] (in Croatian). Zagreb: Centar za demokraciju i pravo Miko Tripalo. pp. 271–290. ISBN 978-953-56875-1-1.
- Miller, Nick (2007). The Nonconformists: Culture, Politics, and Nationalism in a Serbian Intellectual Circle, 1944–1991. Vienna: Central European University Press. ISBN 978-615-52113-6-2.
- Mrkalj, Igor (2020). "Josif Runjanin i "Lijepa naša": činjenice i interpretacije" [Josif Runjanin and "Our Beautiful Homeland": Facts and Interpretations]. Tragovi: časopis za srpske i hrvatske teme (in Croatian). 3 (1). Zagreb: Serb National Council: 7–117. ISSN 2623-8926.
- Pavlowitch, Stevan K. (2007). "The Legacy of Two World Wars: A Historical Essay". In Cohen, Lenard J.; Dragović-Soso, Jasna (eds.). State Collapse in South-Eastern Europe: New Perspectives on Yugoslavia's Disintegration. West Lafayette: Purdue University Press. pp. 75–90. ISBN 978-1-55753-460-6.
- Perović, Latinka (2012). "Prilog proučavanju hrvatskog proljeća" [A Contribution to Study of the Croatian Spring]. In Jakovina, Tvrtko (ed.). Hrvatsko proljeće 40 godina poslije [Croatian Spring 40 Years Later] (in Croatian). Zagreb: Centar za demokraciju i pravo Miko Tripalo. pp. 181–204. ISBN 978-953-56875-1-1.
- Ramet, Sabrina P. (2006). The Three Yugoslavias: State-building and Legitimation, 1918–2005. Bloomington: Indiana University Press. ISBN 978-0-253-34656-8.
- Rusinow, Dennison (2007). "Reopening of the "National Question" in the 1960s". In Cohen, Lenard J.; Dragović-Soso, Jasna (eds.). State Collapse in South-Eastern Europe: New Perspectives on Yugoslavia's Disintegration. West Lafayette: Purdue University Press. pp. 131–148. ISBN 978-1-55753-460-6.
- Strčić, Petar (1988). "Prilog za biografiju Ante Cilige" [Contributions to Biography of Ante Ciliga]. Časopis za suvremenu povijest (in Croatian). 20 (3). Zagreb: Croatian Institute of History: 15–49. ISSN 0590-9597.
- Swain, Geoffrey (2011). Tito: A Biography. London: I.B.Tauris & Co. Ltd. ISBN 978-1-84511-727-6.
- Šentija, Josip (2012). "Što je zapravo bilo hrvatsko proljeće?" [What Was Croatian Spring Really?]. In Jakovina, Tvrtko (ed.). Hrvatsko proljeće 40 godina poslije [Croatian Spring 40 Years Later] (in Croatian). Zagreb: Centar za demokraciju i pravo Miko Tripalo. pp. 3–16. ISBN 978-953-56875-1-1.
- Štiks, Igor (2015). Nations and Citizens in Yugoslavia and the Post-Yugoslav States: One Hundred Years of Citizenship. London: Bloomsbury Publishing. ISBN 978-1-4742-2152-8.
- Tokić, Mate Nikola (2018). "Avengers of Bleiburg: Émigré Politics, Discourses of Victimhood and Radical Separatism during the Cold War". Croatian Political Science Review. 55 (2). Zagreb: Faculty of Political Science, University of Zagreb: 71–88. doi:10.20901/pm.55.2.04. ISSN 0032-3241. S2CID 158070302.
- Trencsényi, Balázs; Kopeček, Michal; Lisjak Gabrijelčič, Luka; Falina, Maria; Baár, Mónika; Janowski, Maciej (2018). A History of Modern Political Thought in East Central Europe: Volume II: Negotiating Modernity in the 'Short Twentieth Century' and Beyond, Part I: 1918–1968. New York: Oxford University Press. ISBN 978-0-19-873715-5.
- Veselinović, Velimir (2016). "Franjo Tuđman i pravaši" [Franjo Tuđman and Croatian Parties of Right]. Politička misao: Časopis za politologiju (in Croatian). 53 (1). Zagreb: University of Zagreb, Faculty of Political Science: 71–102. ISSN 0032-3241.
- Vujić, Antun (2012). "Političke osnove nekih interpretacija hrvatskog proljeća" [Political Basis of Some Interpretations of the Croatian Spring]. In Jakovina, Tvrtko (ed.). Hrvatsko proljeće 40 godina poslije [Croatian Spring 40 Years Later] (in Croatian). Zagreb: Centar za demokraciju i pravo Miko Tripalo. pp. 17–42. ISBN 978-953-56875-1-1.
