= Većeslav Holjevac =

Yugoslav politician (1917–1970)

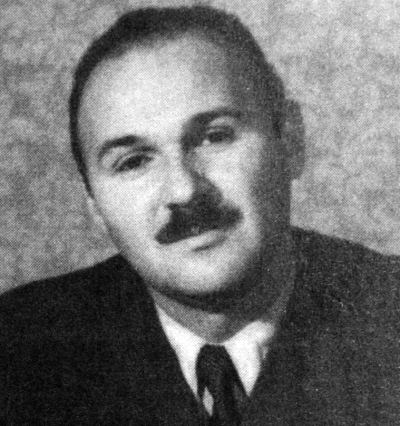

Mayor of Zagreb
- In office 1952–1963
- Preceded by: Mirko Pavleković
- Succeeded by: Pero Pirker

Personal details
- Born: 22 August 1917 Karlovac, Croatia-Slavonia, Austria-Hungary
- Died: 11 July 1970 (aged 52) Zagreb, SR Croatia, SFR Yugoslavia

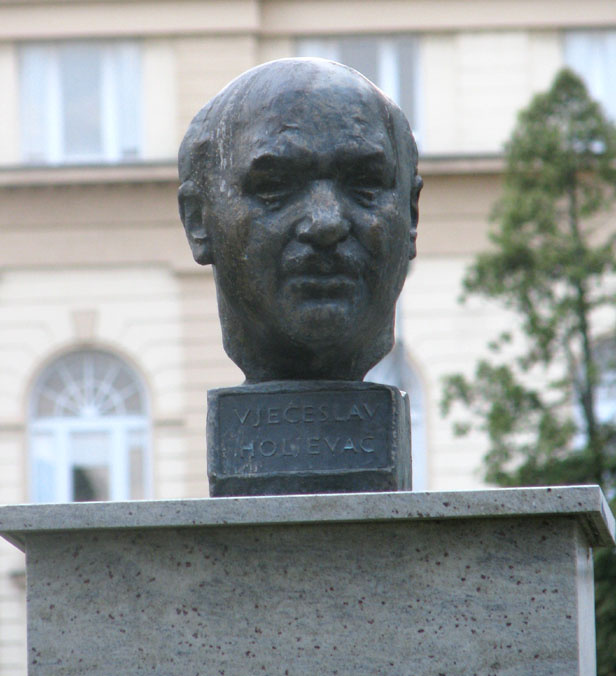
The bust of Većeslav Holjevac in Karlovac.

Većeslav Holjevac (22 August 1917 – 11 July 1970) was a Croatian and Yugoslav soldier and communist politician.

Holjevac was born in Karlovac, at the time in Austria-Hungary. He joined the Communist Party of Yugoslavia in 1939. Following the Axis invasion of Yugoslavia and establishment of Independent State of Croatia, Holjevac was active in resistance movement and in July 1941 he was one of the founders of Partisan units in Kordun and Banovina regions of Croatia. He served as political commissar of Partisan units in that region, including the 4th Croatian Corps, until the end of war.

The most famous action which Holjevac commanded in 1941, happened on November 17 in Karlovac. He was in command of the platoon whose assignment was to liberate partisan Marijan Čavić, who was wounded by Ustashe, captured and set to healthcare in Karlovac hospital. Holjevac's platoon was redressed in Homeguard uniforms, so they entered Karlovac without problems. Unfortunately, Čavić was taken from hospital before their arrival, so the assignment was not completely executed. However, this action made a high impression within the population of Karlovac and neighbouring places.

After the war, Holjevac served in many important posts in Tito's Yugoslavia.

For his war service he received the title of People's Hero of Yugoslavia on Jul 23, 1951. The following year he was named mayor of Zagreb, a post he held until 1963. As such, he is credited with many important construction projects that modernised the city, most notably the creation of Novi Zagreb. He also successfully lobbied for establishment of Zagreb trade fair.

Holjevac died in 1970 in Zagreb.

His daughter Tatjana Holjevac used his legacy to launch her own political career during the 2005 local elections in Zagreb.

A major thoroughfare of Zagreb, Većeslav Holjevac Avenue is named after Većeslav Holjevac.

Preceded by Mirko Pavleković	Mayor of Zagreb; 1952–1963	Succeeded by Pero Pirker
