= Dušan Dragosavac =

Yugoslav politician

President of the Presidency of the LCY Central Committee
- In office 20 October 1981 – 29 June 1982
- Preceded by: Lazar Mojsov
- Succeeded by: Mitja Ribičič

Secretary of the Executive Committee of the League of Communists of Croatia
- In office 9 April 1974 – 26 April 1978
- President: Josip Vrhovec
- Preceded by: Pero Pirker
- Succeeded by: Milutin Baltic

Personal details
- Born: 1 December 1919 Gospić, Kingdom of Serbs, Croats, and Slovenes (modern Croatia)
- Died: 21 December 2014 (aged 95) Zagreb, Croatia
- Party: League of Communists of Yugoslavia (SKJ)
- Education: University of Zagreb (Faculty of Law)

Dušan Dragosavac (Serbian Cyrillic: Душан Драгосавац; 1 December 1919 – 21 December 2014) was a Croatian Serb politician who served as President of the League of Communists of Yugoslavia from 20 October 1981 until 29 June 1982.

Born in the village of Vrebac near Gospić, Dragosavac graduated from the University of Zagreb Faculty of Law. He joined the Young Communist League of Yugoslavia (SKOJ) in 1941 and the League of Communists of Yugoslavia (SKJ) in 1942. During World War II he was a member of the Yugoslav Partisans. After the war he spent his entire career in politics and since the 1950s held various senior positions in the League of Communists of Croatia (SKH), the Croatian branch of the SKJ. He died on 21 December 2014, aged 95.
