= Pero Pirker =

Croatian and Yugoslav politician

Secretary of the Executive Bureau of the League of Communists of Croatia
- In office 28 March 1969 – 14 December 1971
- President: Savka Dabčević-Kučar
- Preceded by: Miko Tripalo
- Succeeded by: Josip Vrhovec

Mayor of Zagreb
- In office 1963–1967
- Preceded by: Većeslav Holjevac
- Succeeded by: Ratko Karlović

Personal details
- Born: 5 July 1927 Varaždin, Kingdom of Serbs, Croats and Slovenes (modern Croatia)
- Died: 1 August 1972 (aged 45) Zagreb, SR Croatia, SFR Yugoslavia
- Party: League of Communists of Croatia; League of Communists of Yugoslavia
- Spouse: Miroslava Pirker (until his death)
- Children: 1
- Occupation: Politician

Pero Pirker (5 July 1927 – 1 August 1972) was a Croatian and Yugoslav politician. He was the mayor of Zagreb from 1963 to 1967. His mayoralty coincided with the 1964 Zagreb flood, the deadliest and costliest natural disaster since the city's incorporation, and he oversaw the rebuilding of the affected areas, including the construction of 26,000 new flats and houses. In 1969 he was elected the Secretary of the Executive Committee of the Central Committee of the ruling League of Communists of Croatia (SKH). He was a close associate of the main political figures of the Croatian Spring – SKH reformist leaders Savka Dabčević-Kučar and Miko Tripalo. After the suppression of that movement in late 1971, tens of thousands were expelled from the SKH, including 741 high-ranking officials such as Pirker, Dabčević-Kučar and Tripalo. Pirker died in August 1972, and his funeral drew 100,000 supporters as a form of protest against the suppression of the Croatian Spring.

== Early life ==
Pero Pirker was born in Varaždin in today's Croatia, then part of the Kingdom of Serbs, Croats and Slovenes. His family had resided in Varaždin since the early 19th century, probably originating from Carinthia. His father, Ivan, was a judge, and the family moved to Otočac following his appointment there. Ivan Pirker became a supreme court justice after World War II. In the years leading up to the war, Pero Pirker joined a youth Communist organisation. During the war, he took part in the Croatian Partisan resistance movement, enrolling at the age of 16. Afterwards, he studied law at the University of Zagreb, and became a Communist party official and Zagreb city council member.

== Mayor of Zagreb ==
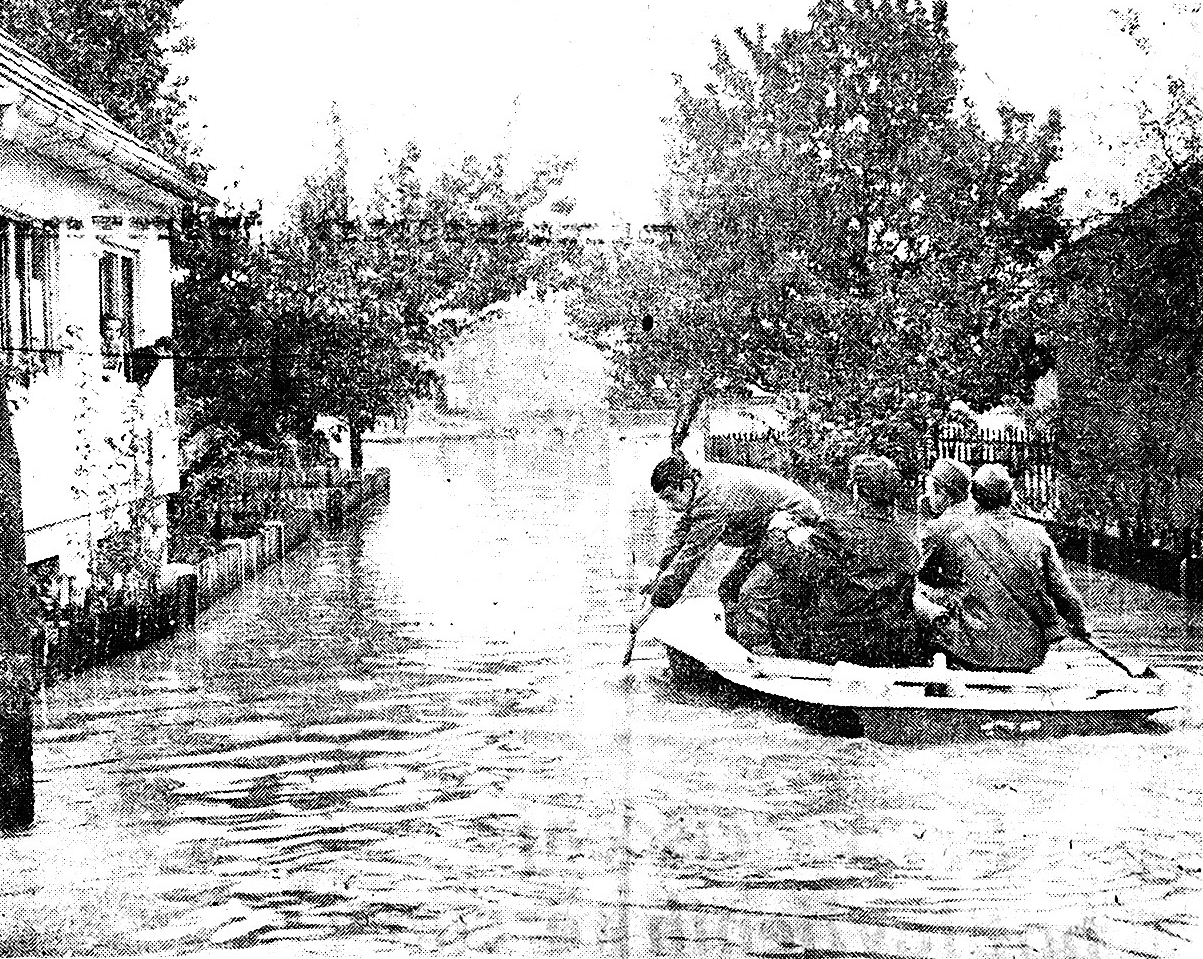
During Pirker's mandate, Zagreb suffered the deadliest and costliest flood since the city's incorporation

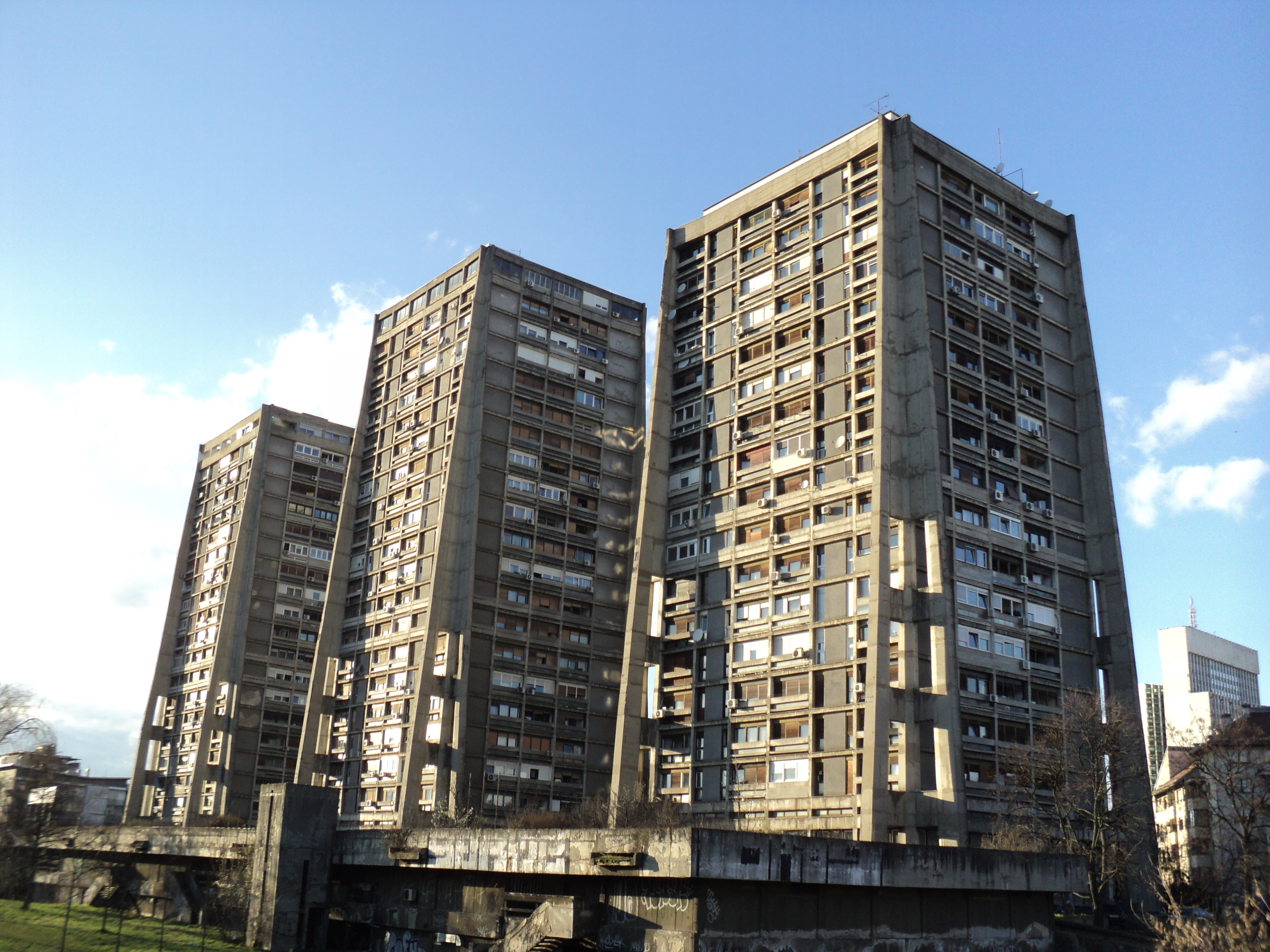
The Richter's Skyscrapers, three of numerous high-rise apartment buildings constructed in the aftermath of the flood

He served as mayor of Zagreb from 1963 to 1967. His term followed the expansion of the city under Većeslav Holjevac. Pirker's mayoralty was defined by a catastrophic flood which struck in October 1964, taking 17 lives, and affecting a third of the city and 180,000 of its 560,000 residents. Around 45,000 residences were damaged and 10,000 were condemned. Sava River had flooded Zagreb several times earlier, but this flood was especially devastating due to the expansion of the city onto the river banks in the preceding decades. Pirker reportedly worked round the clock during the flood and in the aftermath. He oversaw repairs and reconstruction in the flooded areas, and the construction of a system of flood defences and embankments which have protected Zagreb from Sava River floods to the present day. Temporary housing was constructed in areas unaffected by flooding, including new planned neighbourhoods Botinec and Retkovec, in order to house those who lost their homes and flats. Thirty kilometres (19 mi) of new embankments were constructed, which would protect the city from future floods.

In 1965, Pirker's city council adopted a modern urban plan, which would accommodate for a near-doubling of the city's population by 1993. The long-term plan for new housing units eventually proved overly ambitious, but the program did set the city's development strategy for the next three decades. While some of Pirker's urban planning decisions were continuations of plans set out during the mayoralty of his predecessor, Većeslav Holjevac – many were original. Pirker reportedly frequently consulted Zagreb's industry leaders and architects.

Pirker's term yielded 26,000 new flats and single-family houses, including the realisation of several new superblock neighbourhoods in Novi Zagreb. Thirty-four new schools and six new kindergartens were built. Other infrastructural projects included the Mičevec freight railway bridge, a new 5,000 m^{2} (54,000 sq ft) terminal, a 60,000 m^{2} (650,000 sq ft) apron and air traffic control infrastructure for the recently built Zagreb Airport, a new road to Sisak, and a railway flyover near Velika Gorica. Numerous factories were constructed or moved out of the inner city, among others the Gredelj train carriage factory in Vukomerec, Pliva's geomycin plant, Sljeme pig farm, Agrokoka chicken farm, and a water extraction site in Mala Mlaka. Department stores totalling 107,000 m^{2} (1,150,000 sq ft) in floor space were constructed. In 1963, Pirker opened the Sljeme cable car, the longest single-cable lift in Europe at the time, whose construction began during Holjevac's mayoralty.

== Croatian Spring ==
In 1969, Pirker was elected member of the Executive Committee of the Central Committee of the ruling League of Communists of Croatia (SKH). Along with Savka Dabčević-Kučar and Mika Tripalo, he took a leading role in the Croatian Spring, a reformist and decentralisation faction of the SKH seeking greater economic, political and cultural autonomy of SR Croatia within Yugoslavia with support of a wider grassroots movement. According to Stipe Mesić, Pirker was member of a more progressive faction within the movement which ultimately lost out. The Croatian Spring was repudiated by President Josip Broz Tito in December 1971, and Pirker and others were forced to resign their positions. In May 1972, they were banned from the SKH. Pirker subsequently exited politics.

== Death and legacy ==
Pirker helped found the Croatian League Against Cancer in 1966, and was elected its first president in 1967.

In mid-1972, Pirker was affected by an aggressive lung cancer, of which he died on 1 August 1972. He was buried at Zagreb's Mirogoj Cemetery. His funeral drew a crowd of about 100,000 and the size of the crowd is interpreted as a sign of support for the SKH leadership purged less than a year previously – including Pirker. Ten people who openly protested his treatment by the authorities were arrested. Due to his role in the Croatian Spring he remained unpopular with the Yugoslav government, which allowed him to fade from public memory.

No streets have ever been named after him in Varaždin, nor in Zagreb proper, but there is a Pero Pirker Street in the Zagreb suburb of Sesvetski Kraljevec. A street in Slavonski Brod is also named after him.

In 2021, a year after the 2020 Zagreb earthquake and following the death of controversial mayor Milan Bandić, a biography of Pirker by Goran Beus Richembergh began trending on Facebook and in Croatian news media, which contrasted the achievements, including the recovery from the flood, of the poorly remembered Pirker with Bandić's "miserly and barren" mayoral work.

== Personal life ==
He was married to Miroslava Pirker, a teacher. When Pero Pirker was 22, they had a daughter, Snježana.

Political offices
Preceded by Većeslav Holjevac	Mayor of Zagreb; 1963–1967	Succeeded by Josip Kolar; Ratko Karlović (acting)
