= Miko Tripalo =

Croatian politician (1926–1995)

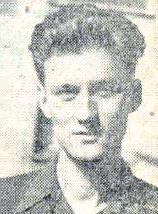

Secretary of the Executive Bureau of the League of Communists of Croatia
- In office 26 October 1966 – 28 March 1969
- President: Vladimir Bakarić
- Preceded by: Office established
- Succeeded by: Pero Pirker

Personal details
- Born: 16 November 1926 Sinj, Kingdom of Serbs, Croats, and Slovenes (modern Croatia)
- Died: 11 December 1995 (aged 69) Zagreb, Croatia
- Party: League of Communists of Yugoslavia (joined in 1943)

Ante "Miko" Tripalo (16 November 1926 – 11 December 1995) was a Yugoslavian Croatian politician. He was one of the members of Croatian Spring, a movement for higher level of autonomy of SR Croatia within SFR Yugoslavia.

== Biography ==
A son of a well-to-do farmers' family near Sinj, in 1941 he joined the League of Communist Youth of Yugoslavia and Josip Broz Tito's Partisans. During the war, he was a commissar in the 8th Dalmatian Corps.

Later he joined the Communist Party of Yugoslavia and rose through its ranks, getting many important positions in Yugoslavia.

Gradually, Tripalo rose to enough prominence to join the second generation of top Communist officials in Yugoslavia. They were, under tacit blessing of Tito, supposed to introduce various economic and political reforms in late 1960s. Tripalo, together with Savka Dabčević-Kučar, became one of the leaders of the Croatian Communist Party.

In 1970, Tripalo and Dabčević-Kučar introduced a new party platform that demanded more autonomy for Croatia within Yugoslavia. The platform was promoted through mass rallies, soon becoming a popular movement, later called Croatian Spring. Dabčević-Kučar and Tripalo became the most popular politicians in Croatia at the time.

The new policy was opposed by more conservative elements of the party and Yugoslav People's Army and also created many ethnic tensions in parts of Croatia with large Serb minority. That, and Croatian students making even more radical demands, finally led Tito to openly turn against Dabčević-Kučar and Tripalo at Karađorđevo Party conference in December 1971. Dabčević-Kučar and Tripalo were quickly removed from their Party positions and, ultimately, from public life.

In 1989, with an arrival of multi-party democracy in Croatia, Tripalo re-emerged in Croatian politics as one of the top opposition figures. He published a book called Croatian Spring, claiming that the movement, previously known as Maspok, was inspired by Prague Spring and extinguished in the same manner.

Tripalo and Dabčević-Kučar believed themselves to be the obvious leaders of Croatian opposition, although they refused to form their own party. Instead, they initiated creation of Coalition of People's Accord – a broad alliance of mostly moderate nationalist parties – whom they led during 1990 parliamentary elections. Their hopes were soon extinguished due to electoral law favouring only the two strongest parties, one of them being the Croatian Communist Party, recently rebranded into Social Democratic Party of Croatia. The other, more likely to exploit popular dissatisfaction with Communism and Yugoslavia, as well as fear of emerging Serb nationalism, was Croatian Democratic Union under Franjo Tuđman. Coalition finished third and won only a handful of seats.

A few months later, in autumn 1990, Tripalo and Dabčević-Kučar finally initiated creation of their own party that would later become Croatian People's Party.

In the next few years, Tripalo, always in the shadow of more charismatic and more popular Dabčević-Kučar, began to distance himself from his long-term political partner. This became apparent after 1992 and Dabčević-Kučar's failure at parliamentary and presidential elections, events that coincided with the rise of hardline nationalist faction within HDZ. Tripalo, unlike Dabčević-Kučar, was increasingly troubled by the prospect of Croatia shifting to the far right and even more by the prospects of HNS not being opposed to certain tendencies associated with far right. In 1994 he left HNS and joined newly formed left-wing party called Social Democratic Action of Croatia (ASH). The party failed to make much of an impact on 1995 parliamentary elections.

=== Death ===
Tripalo, faced with deteriorating health, died a few years later.
