= Opinion polling for the 2011 Croatian parliamentary election =

Opinion polling for the 2011 Croatian parliamentary election started early after the previous election with polls on individual parties. As electoral coalitions were formed, coalition ratings started to be polled as well. The poll results below are listed by category and ordered in reverse chronological order. Major political events are indicated chronologically between individual polls. Concurrent polling was at the time also done for the 2012 Croatian European Union membership referendum.

== Exit polls ==
=== Seat projections ===
The three main national television stations contracted Ipsos Puls to conduct exit polling at 403 stations.

Date	Polling Organisation/Client	Sample size	HDZ · HGS · DC	Kukuriku	HSS	HDSSB	HSP	HSLS	Labour	Jurčić et al.	Grubišić et al.	HSP-AS · HČSP	Ladonja
4 Dec 2011 19:50	Ipsos Puls for HRT/Nova TV/RTL Televizija	30,000	40	82	2	6	0	0	6	0	2	1	1
4 Dec 2011 19:00	Ipsos Puls for HRT/Nova TV/RTL Televizija	25,000	40	83	2	6	0	0	6	0	2	1	0

== Campaign poll results ==
=== Overall party rating ===
Generic national polls are conducted to indicate overall party rating and provide a trend indicator, while the actual election is conducted not with a single electoral unit but with the Croatian Parliament electoral districts.

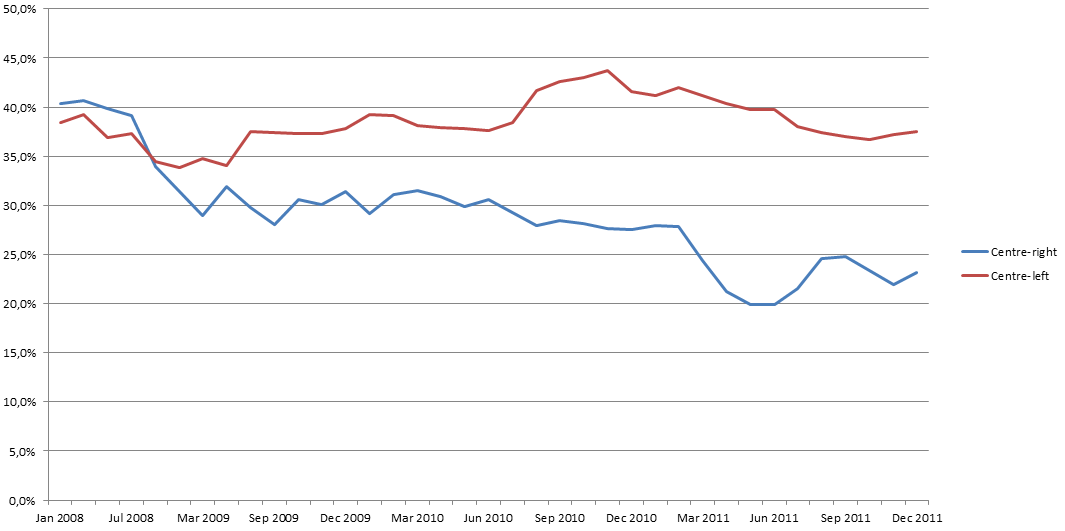
Cro Demoskop polling since January 2008 for the Croatian parliamentary election 2011.

The listed poll dates are either the dates when the poll was conducted, or alternatively the date when the poll result was published.

Date	Polling Organisation/Client	Sample size	HDZ	Kukuriku	HSS	HDSSB	HSP	HSLS	Labour	Jurčić et al.	Other	Undecided
4 Dec	Election Day.											
3 Dec	Election silence begins.											
29-30 Nov	CRO Demoskop	1,300	19%	37.5%	4.2%	2.5%	4.4%	3.2%	5.6%	3.2%	6.4%	14%
25 Nov	Ipsos Puls for Nova TV	1,000	19%	37.5%	2.7%	2.7%	2.5%	2.8%	6.6%	4.3%	5.4%	14.7%
17 Nov	Official candidate lists finalized.											
8 Nov	Croatian Democratic Union signs a pre-election coalition with the Croatian Citizen Party in two electoral districts.											
2-3 Nov	CRO Demoskop	1,300	18.3%	37.2%	3.6%	2.5%	3.9%	3.1%	5.7%	3%	4.7%	18%
31 Oct	General election officially called: President of the Republic agrees to a dissolution of Parliament, allowing the general election to take place on 4 December.											
28 Oct	MPs vote to dissolve Parliament.											
28 Oct	Former PM and leader of HDZ Ivo Sanader appears in court for the first of many pending trials for corruption.											
27 Oct	As a result of the ongoing investigation of the party's 'black funds', USKOK and the Attorney General issue an indictment against HDZ as a legal entity.											
25 Oct	Ipsos Puls for Nova TV	1,000	20.3%	38.8%	2.5%	1.6%	4.7%	1.6%	6.3%	4.4%	6.8%	13%
13 Oct	After Vladimir Šeks and HDZ caused a number of incidents in a parliamentary immunity proceedings, most of the opposition parties (Kukuriku coalition and Labour) decided to boycott the work of the Sabor. Their concerns were also echoed by SDSS which is part of the ruling coalition, causing a quorum issue.											
6 Oct	Ljubo Jurčić signs a formal pre-election coalition agreement with the Party of Pensioners and the Alliance of Primorje-Gorski Kotar.											
3-4 Oct	CRO Demoskop	1,300	19%	36.7%	4.4%	2.5%	3.7%	3.5%	~5%		7.2%	18%
27 Sep	HDZ reveals its manifesto for the upcoming election.											
26 Sep	Ipsos Puls for Nova TV	1,000	20.1%	37.2%	4.2%	3.5%	4.5%	2.5%	6.1%	5.1%	7.2%	9.6%
23 Sep	USKOK issues a second indictment against Ivo Sanader for taking a 10 million euro bribe from MOL											
18 Sep	Hendal for HRT	873	10%	33.4%	0.9%	0.9%	1.9%	1.6%	2.4%		8.7%	40.2%
17 Sep	HDZ holds its 14th party convention.											
15 Sep	Kukuriku coalition reveals its political manifesto called 'Plan 21'.											
11 Sep	Former HDZ treasurer Branka Pavošević testifies to USKOK about the party's 'black funds' and illegal finances used for previous elections.											
1-2 Sep	CRO Demoskop	1,300	20.4%	37%	4.4%	2%	2.8%	3.2%	4.9%		7%	19.7%
25 Aug	Ipsos Puls for Nova TV	1,000	20.8%	35.3%	5.7%	3.5%	3.5%	3.2%	5.3%	4.3%	9.5%	12.1%
23 Aug	Prizma for HDZ	3,000	24.9%	37.8%								
1-3 Aug	CRO Demoskop	1,300	20.1%	37.4%	4.5%	<2%	3.1%	2.8%	4.3%	<2%	N/A	20.4%
25 Jul	Ipsos Puls for Nova TV	1,000	23.8%	37.8%	4.3%	3.1%	3.6%	3.3%	4.7%	N/A	9%	11%
15 Jul	Kukuriku coalition leaders sign a formal pre-election coalition agreement.											

=== Seat projections ===
Because the seats in the Parliament are split according to Croatian Parliament electoral districts, seat projections significantly vary from a generic overall poll.

The seat projections do not include:

- the 8 seats from minority voters, and these representatives are not usually strictly aligned with mainstream parties
- the 3 seats from voters residing abroad, which have in every election since independence gone to HDZ

The new composition of Parliament will have 151 seats meaning that 76 seats will be needed for a majority.

Because of the nature of the D'Hondt method and the division into constituencies, seat projections are less reliable, so some polls list tentative options, indicated in parentheses.

The listed poll dates are either the dates when the poll was conducted, or alternatively the date when the poll result was published.

Date	Polling Organisation/Client	Sample size	HDZ	Kukuriku	HSS	HDSSB	HSP	HSLS	Labour	Jurčić et al.	Grubišić et al.	HSP-AS	Other
15-28 Nov 2011	Promocija Plus for HRT	8,000	42	79	1	4	3	1	7	1	1	1	0
15-29 Nov 2011	Ipsos Puls for Večernji list, Media servis & Nova TV	4,171	43	79	3	5	1	3	4	1	1	0	0
15-25 Nov 2011	GFK for RTL	4,000	39	85	1	4	4	1	3	1	2	0	0
11-24 Nov 2011	Mediana Fides for Jutarnji list	4,000	41	83	1	3	3	1	6	1	1	0	0
4 Nov 2011	Ipsos Puls for Večernji list, Media servis & Nova TV	4,047	41	78	2 (3)	4	1	1	7 (3)	4	1 (0)	1	0
14-28 Oct 2011	GFK for RTL	4,000	35	90	0	3	5	1	5	1	0	0	0
25 Oct 2011	Promocija Plus for HNS	8,000	44	77	2 (2)	4 (1)	2	0 (4)	6	2 (3)	0	0	3

== Early polling ==
=== Overall party rating ===
Generic national polls are conducted to indicate overall party rating and provide a trend indicator, while the actual election is conducted not with a single electoral unit but with the Croatian Parliament electoral districts.

The listed poll dates are either the dates when the poll was conducted, or alternatively the date when the poll result was published.

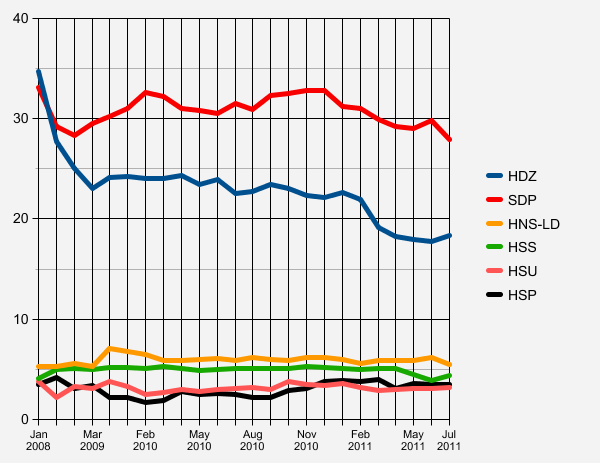
CRO Demoskop poll performance since the last general election: Six parties

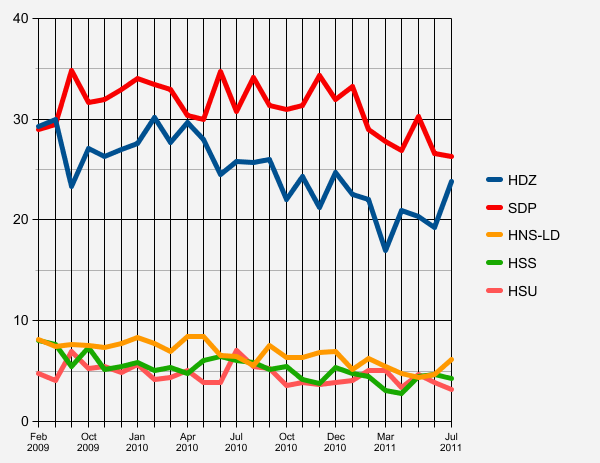
Ipsos Puls poll performance since February, 2009: Five parties

==== 2011 ====
Date	Polling Organisation/Client	Sample size	HDZ	SDP	HNS-LD	HSS	HSU	HSP	HSLS	Other	Undecided	HDZ coalition	SDP coalition
1-2 Jul	CRO Demoskop	1,300	18.4%	27.9%	5.5%	4.4%	3.2%	3.5%	2.2%	N/A	N/A	21.5%	38%
26 Jun	Ipsos Puls for Nova TV	1,000	19.3%	26.6%	4.7%	4.7%	3.9%	4.6%	4.4%	17.3%	14.5%	20.6%	35.9%
2-3 Jun	CRO Demoskop	1,300	17.8%	29.8%	6.2%	3.9%	3.1%	3.5%	2.1%	N/A	N/A	19.9%	39.8%
25 May	Ipsos Puls for Nova TV	1,000	20.3%	30.3%	4.4%	4.5%	4.7%	6.1%	2.9%	7.9%	14.7%	22%	38.2%
16 May	GFK for RTL	600	8%	26.4%	3.3%	0.9%	2.6%	1.5%	1.5%	N/A	40.9%		
2–3 May	CRO Demoskop	1,300	18%	29%	5.9%	4.5%	3.1%	3.6%	2.6%	N/A	N/A	19.9%	39.8%
22 Apr	Ipsos Puls for Nova TV	1,000	20.9%	26.9%	4.8%	2.8%	3.4%	4%	2.6%	16.8%	17.8%	22.5%	33.2%
15 Apr	Former Croatian general Ante Gotovina is sentenced to 24 years in prison by ICTY after being found guilty of war crimes during Operation Storm.												
1-3 Apr	CRO Demoskop	1,300	18.3%	29.2%	5.9%	5.1%	3%	3.1%	3.2%	N/A	N/A	21.2%	40.4%
24 Mar	Ipsos Puls for Nova TV	1,000	17%	27.8%	5.5%	3.1%	5.1%	5.3%	2%	15.8%	18.4%	18.9%	40.9%
20 Mar	Mediana Fides for Jutarnji list		15.1%	26.7%	5%	1.3%	3.1%	1.5%	2.2%	N/A	15.9%		
14 Mar	GFK for RTL	600	6.6%	30%	3.3%	0.6%	0.4%	1.5%	0.4%	N/A	41.7%		
4 Mar	CRO Demoskop	1,300	19.2%	29.9%	5.9%	5.1%	2.9%	4%	3.1%	N/A	N/A	24.4%	41.2%
2 Mar	Anti-government protests are held across the country. The protesters burn the flags of major political parties as well as the flag of Europe and calling for an early general election.												
24 Feb	Ipsos Puls for Nova TV	1,000	22%	29%	6.3%	4.5%	5.1%	3.2%	3.2%	14.1%	12.6%	24.2%	44.3%
1-2 Feb	CRO Demoskop	1,300	21.9%	31%	5.6%	5%	3.2%	3.8%	3.8%	N/A	N/A	27.8%	42%
25 Jan	Ipsos Puls for Nova TV	1,000	22.5%	33.3%	5.2%	4.8%	4.1%	4.4%	N/A	12.5%	11.1%	24.2%	44.3%
3-4 Jan	CRO Demoskop	1,300	22.6%	31.2%	6%	5.1%	3.6%	3.9%	4.2%	N/A	N/A	27.9%	41.2%

==== 2010 ====
Date	Polling Organisation/Client	Sample size	HDZ	SDP	HNS-LD	HSS	HSU	HSP	HSLS	Other	Undecided	HDZ coalition	SDP coalition
27 Dec	Prime Minister Jadranka Kosor reshuffles the Cabinet with four ministerial changes as well as adding a new vice-presidential post.												
25 Dec	Ipsos Puls for Nova TV	1,000	24.7%	32%	6.9%	5.4%	3.9%	3.6%	4.2%	N/A	N/A	27.4%	47%
10 Dec	Ivo Sanader is arrested in Salzburg, Austria.												
9 Dec	Former Prime Minister and leader of HDZ Ivo Sanader flees the country after he is indicted under charges of corruption. He is put on the Interpol wanted list.												
7 Dec	Ipsos Puls for Nova TV	4,000	21.2%	34.3%	6.8%	3.8%	3.7%	4.4%	3.7%	14.2%	7.9%	20.5%	44%
30 Nov-1 Dec	CRO Demoskop	1,300	22.1%	32.8%	6.2%	5.2%	3.4%	3.8%	3.6%	N/A	N/A	27.5%	41.6%
25 Nov	Ipsos Puls for Nova TV	1,000	24.3%	31.4%	6.4%	4.2%	3.9%	3.6%	3.5%	12.9%	9.8%	25.5%	42.1%
23 Nov	Leaders of the four main opposition parties: SDP, HNS-LD, IDS and HSU; sign a declaration in Kastav officially forming a coalition for the next parliamentary election called Alliance for Change												
2-3 Nov	CRO Demoskop	1,300	22.3%	32.8%	6.2%	5.3%	3.5%	3.1%	3.1%	N/A	N/A	27.6%	43.7%
29 Oct	Ipsos Puls for Nova TV	1,000	22%	31%	6.4%	5.5%	3.6%	N/A	N/A	15.4%	13.7%	25.2%	40.5%
15 Oct	Former Vice President of the Government Damir Polančec is sentenced to 15 months in prison for abuse of power while Minister of the Economy. A letter surfaces where Polančec accuses Prime Minister Kosor and the Vice President of Parliament Vladimir Šeks of knowing the judge's verdict over a month before it was actually sentenced.												
13 Oct	Former Prime Minister Ivo Sanader reactivates his mandate in Parliament.												
4-5 Oct	CRO Demoskop	1,300	23%	32.5%	5.9%	5.1%	3.8%	2.9%	2.9%	N/A	N/A	28.2%	43%
30 Sep	Ipsos Puls for Nova TV	1,000	26%	31.4%	7.5%	5.2%	5.3%	5.3%	N/A	9%	10.3%	25.1%	41.6%
1-2 Sep	CRO Demoskop	1,300	23.4%	32.3%	6%	5.1%	3%	2.2%	3.2%	N/A	N/A	28.5%	42.6%
31 Aug	Ipsos Puls for Nova TV	964	25.7%	34.1%	5.6%	5.9%	5.5%	N/A	3.8%	8.4%	N/A	25.8%	42.9%
1-2 Aug	CRO Demoskop	1,300	22.7%	30.9%	6.2%	5.1%	3.2%	2.2%	1.9%	N/A	N/A	27.9%	41.7%
28 Jul	Ipsos Puls for Nova TV	1,000	25.8%	30.8%	6.5%	6.1%	7%	4.2%	3%	8%	N/A	29.9%	40.5%
13-16 Jul	Mediana Fides for Jutarnji list	700	25.4%	32.4%	4.4%	3.7%	1.4%	2.4%	1.6%	6.2%	19.5%	25%	44%
12 Jul	The Government signs an agreement with three independents: the Croatian Social Liberal Party's two former representatives and Zlatko Horvat. This brings the governing coalition from 82 to 83 of 153 seats in parliament.												
11 Jul	The leaders of the four main opposition parties: SDP, HNS-LD, IDS and HSU; hold a meeting in Baranja and announce their intention to form a coalition for the next general election.												
10 Jul	Darinko Kosor, the leader of the Croatian Social Liberal Party, announce his party's decision to leave the governing coalition.												
1-2 Jul	CRO Demoskop	1,300	22.5%	31.5%	5.9%	5.1%	3.1%	2.5%	1.7%	N/A	N/A		
30 Jun	Ipsos Puls for Nova TV	1,000	24.5%	34.7%	6.6%	6.5%	3.9%	4%	N/A	N/A	N/A	30.7%	44.7%
24 Jun	Labour Unions announce they have collected the necessary number of signatures to trigger a binding referendum against the new labour bill proposed by the Government.												
1-2 Jun	CRO Demoskop	1,300	23.9%	30.5%	6.1%	5%	3%	2.6%	1.7%	N/A	N/A		
31 May	Ipsos Puls for Nova TV	1,000	28%	30%	8.4%	6.1%	3.9%	4.1%	N/A	18.7%	N/A	33%	42%
3–4 May	CRO Demoskop	1,300	23.4%	30.8%	6%	4.9%	2.8%	2.5%	1.6%	N/A	N/A		
30 Apr	Ipsos Puls for Nova TV	962	29.7%	30.4%	8.4%	4.8%	5.1%	N/A	N/A	11%	10%	36.4%	39.8%
31 Mar-1 April	CRO Demoskop	1,300	24.3%	31%	5.9%	5.1%	3%	2.8%	N/A	N/A	N/A		
30 Mar	Former Vice President of the Government of Croatia Damir Polančec, the Minister of the Economy in the Sanader II and, until his resignation, the current Kosor cabinet is arrested under charges of corruption during his tenure as a member of government.												
25 Mar	Ipsos Puls for Nova TV	?	27.7%	33%	6.9%	5.4%	4.4%	4.1%	N/A	7.5%	11%		
4 Mar	CRO Demoskop	1,300	24%	32.2%	5.9%	5.3%	2.7%	1.9%	2.2%	N/A	N/A		
27 Feb	Ipsos Puls for Nova TV	?	30.2%	33.4%	7.7%	5.1%	4.2%	3.4%	2.8%	4.9%	N/A	37.9%	42%
3 Feb	CRO Demoskop	1,300	24%	32.6%	6.5%	5.1%	2.5%	1.7%	2%	N/A	N/A		
29 Jan	Ipsos Puls for Nova TV	1,000	27.6%	34%	8.3%	5.9%	5.7%	2.7%	2%	N/A	N/A	32.9%	45.2%
10 Jan	SDP presidential candidate Ivo Josipović is elected the third President of the Republic.												
4-5 Jan	CRO Demoskop	1,300	23.5%	33%	6.2%	4.7%	2.8%	N/A	N/A	N/A	N/A		
3 Jan	Former Prime Minister Ivo Sanader issues a press conference attacking Jadranka Kosor, Andrija Hebrang and most of the HDZ party leaders for their 'failed leadership', announcing his return. He is expelled from the party the day after.												

==== 2009 ====
Date	Polling Organisation/Client	Sample size	HDZ	SDP	HNS-LD	HSS	HSU	HSP	HSLS	Other	Undecided
31 Dec	Ipsos Puls for Nova TV	?	27%	33%	7.8%	5.5%	4.9%	N/A	N/A	12.2%	9.6%
30 Nov-1 Dec	CRO Demoskop	1,300	24.2%	31%	6.8%	5.2%	3.3%	2.2%	2%	9%	18.5%
30 Nov	Ipsos Puls for Nova TV	?	26.3%	32%	7.3%	5.2%	5.5%	3.8%	N/A	7.5%	12.4%
4 Nov	CRO Demoskop	1,300	24.6%	30.8%	6.5%	4.5%	N/A	N/A	N/A	N/A	N/A
31 Oct	Ipsos Puls for Nova TV	?	27.1%	31.7%	7.5%	7.3%	5.3%	N/A	N/A	N/A	N/A
30 Oct	Damir Polančec, member of the HDZ Presidency, resigns as Deputy Prime Minister and Minister of the Economy following allegations of corruption.										
31 Sep-1 Oct	CRO Demoskop	1,300	24.1%	30.2%	7.1%	5.2%	3.8%	2.2%	1.3%	7.1%	21.2%
3 Sep	CRO Demoskop	1,300	21.9%	30.5%	6.9%	5.1%	N/A	N/A	N/A	N/A	N/A
1 Aug	Ipsos Puls for Nova TV	?	23.3%	34.8%	7.6%	5.5%	6.9%	3.1%	N/A	8.3%	10%
1-2 Jul	CRO Demoskop	1,300	23.7%	28.4%	N/A	N/A	N/A	N/A	N/A	N/A	N/A
1 Jul	Prime Minister Ivo Sanader resigns giving no specific reason. Jadranka Kosor becomes the new Prime Minister.										
6 May	CRO Demoskop	1,300	25.3%	28.9%	N/A	N/A	N/A	N/A	N/A	N/A	N/A
31 Mar	Ipsos Puls for Nova TV	1,000	30%	29.5%	7.4%	7.6%	4.1%	3.6%	N/A	8.3%	9.5%
5 Mar	CRO Demoskop	1,300	23%	29.5%	5.3%	5%	3.1%	3.4%	N/A	N/A	N/A
28 Feb	Ipsos Puls for Nova TV	1,000	29.3%	29%	8.1%	8%	4.8%	N/A	N/A	8.8%	12%
5 Feb	CRO Demoskop	1,300	25%	28.3%	5.6%	5.1%	3.3%	3.1%	1.3%	N/A	N/A

==== 2008 ====
Date	Polling Organisation/Client	Sample size	HDZ	SDP	HNS-LD	HSS	HSU	HSP	HSLS	Other	Undecided
3-4 Oct	CRO Demoskop	1,300	27.7%	29.2%	5.3%	5%	2.2%	4.2%	1.3%	6.7%	N/A
31 Jul-1 Aug	CRO Demoskop	1,300	31.8%	31.3%	N/A	N/A	N/A	N/A	N/A	N/A	N/A
4 Jul	CRO Demoskop	1,300	32.9%	31.9%	5.4%	5.2%	N/A	N/A	N/A	N/A	N/A
2 May	CRO Demoskop	1,300	33.7%	31.5%	5.4%	5.2%	N/A	1.8%	N/A	N/A	N/A
4 Feb	CRO Demoskop	1,300	35.6%	33.8%	5.4%	4.1%	3%	N/A	N/A	N/A	N/A
11 Jan	The sixth assembly of Parliament is constituted.										
7 Jan	CRO Demoskop	1,300	34.7%	33.1%	5.3%	4.1%	3.8%	3.5%	1.6%	N/A	N/A

==== 2007 ====
Date	Polling Organisation/Client	Sample size	HDZ	SDP	HNS-LD	HSS	HSU	HSP	HSLS	Other	Undecided
25 Nov	2007 parliamentary election	2,429,078	36.6%	31.2%	6.8%	6.5%^{*}	4.1%^{*}	3.5%	6.5%^{*}	10.7%	N/A

^{*} – HSS and HSLS contested the election together, with HSS being the senior partner. HSU contested the election with another smaller party.

=== Seat projections ===
The seat projections do not include:

- the 8 seats from minority voters, and these representatives are not usually strictly aligned with mainstream parties
- the 3 seats from voters residing abroad, which have in every election since independence gone to HDZ

The new composition of Parliament will have 151 seats meaning that 76 seats will be needed for a majority.

The listed poll dates are either the dates when the poll was conducted, or alternatively the date when the poll result was published.

==== Coalition rating ====
Date	Polling Organisation/Client	Sample size	HDZ-HSS-DC	SDP-HNS-IDS-HSU	Other
7 December 2010	Ipsos Puls for Nova TV	2,619	41	85	14
25 November 2010	Ipsos Puls for Nova TV	1,000	49	80	11

==== Party rating ====
The listed poll dates are either the dates when the poll was conducted, or alternatively the date when the poll result was published.

Date	Polling Organisation/Client	Sample size	HDZ	SDP	HNS-LD	HSS	HDSSB	IDS	HSU	HSP	HSLS	Other
7 Dec 2010	Ipsos Puls for Nova TV	4,000	42	69	9	4	4	2	2	4	2	2
25 Nov 2010	Ipsos Puls for Nova TV	1,000	50	68	8	2	3	4	1	1	1	2
