= 2011 Croatian parliamentary election =

- 4 December 2011
- All 151 seats in the Croatian Parliament; 76 seats needed for a majority
- Opinion polls
- Turnout: 56.29% (▼3.19pp)
Party	Leader	Vote %	Seats	+/–
Kukuriku Coalition	Zoran Milanović	40.72	80	+13
HDZ Coalition	Jadranka Kosor	23.93	47	−19
Labour	Dragutin Lesar	5.17	6	New
HSS–ZS–SP	Josip Friščić	3.13	1	−5
HDSSB	Vladimir Šišljagić	2.93	6	+3
HSP AS–HČSP	Ruža Tomašić	2.81	1	+1
Independents	—	4.47	2	+2
Minority lists
SDSS	Vojislav Stanimirović	73.36	3	0
MESZ	Deneš Šoja	51.53	1	0
Kukuriku Coalition	Vladimir Bilek	45.39	1	New
BDSH	Nedžad Hodžić	26.51	1	New
EU CPI	Veljko Kajtazi	18.88	1	New
Independent	—	–	1	0
This lists parties that won seats. See the complete results below.
Result by constituency
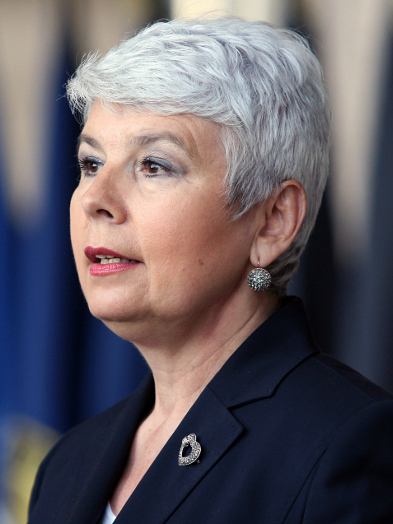

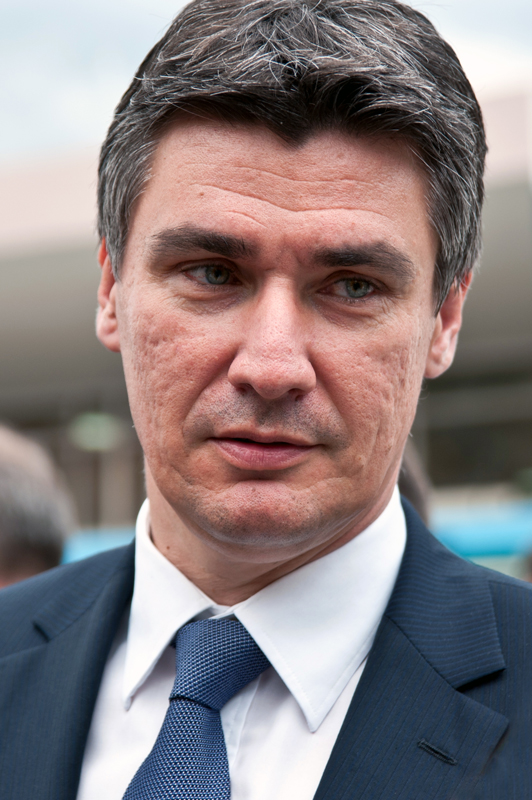
Prime Minister before	Prime Minister after
Jadranka Kosor; HDZ	Zoran Milanović; SDP

Parliamentary elections were held in Croatia on Sunday, 4 December 2011 to elect 151 members to the Croatian Parliament. They were the sixth parliamentary election in Croatia since independence.

Elections were held in 10 electoral districts inside Croatia (each electing 14 members of parliament), one electoral district for Croatian citizens living abroad (3 members of parliament), and one electoral district for national minorities (8 members of parliament). Candidate lists have to win more than 5% of the votes in an electoral district in order to be represented in Parliament.

The previous elections were a close race between the two major political alliances and resulted with Ivo Sanader winning a second term as Prime Minister. After his sudden and unexpected resignation in mid-2009, Jadranka Kosor succeeded him as head of the governing party (Croatian Democratic Union, HDZ) and formed a new Government. Zoran Milanović, despite losing a close race four years ago, was again chosen to be the Opposition's candidate for prime minister.

Domestic policy and the economy were the main themes of the campaign. The cabinet supported by the parliamentary majority, marked by numerous corruption scandals, high unemployment and a grim economic outlook, was highly unpopular and had been lagging in the polls since early 2009.

The elections resulted in a resounding loss for the governing parties with HDZ and the Croatian Peasant Party (HSS) receiving the lowest number of seats and the lowest share of the vote in their histories. HDZ lost a total of 21 seats, losing all but two electoral districts in the country. HSS was reduced to a sixth of its previous membership, with two sitting ministers losing their seats. The centre-left four party Kukuriku coalition, led by the Social Democratic Party of Croatia (SDP) contested the election, unlike four years ago, with a joint appearance and won the election in a landslide achieving an absolute majority with 81 elected members. All members of the coalition, except the Istrian Democratic Assembly (IDS), achieved their best results yet. This election was the first in which HDZ did not become the strongest individual party in Parliament, with the Social Democrats winning almost twenty more seats.

== Background ==
After two consecutive wins in 2003 and 2007, the governing HDZ was hoping to secure yet another term in office. The Social Democrats sought a first win after two consecutive parliamentary losses since 2000.

The 2007 election resulted in the formation of the Sanader II cabinet, supported by a narrow majority of 7. One of the main goals of the administration was completing Croatian negotiations with the European Union. Croatia had been a candidate for EU since 2005. In December 2008 Slovenia blocked the negotiation progress of Croatia due to a border dispute. Sanader and his Slovenian counterpart Borut Pahor were unable to settle their differences in the following months which meant Croatian's accession to the European Union was in a standstill.

The 2009 local elections were held on 17 and 31 May and resulted with the Social Democrats making considerable gains in certain traditionally HDZ-leaning cities and constituencies, such as Dubrovnik, Šibenik, Trogir and Vukovar, as well as retaining such major traditionally SDP-leaning cities as Zagreb and Rijeka.

On 1 July 2009, Ivo Sanader announced he was resigning the Premiership and leaving his deputy Jadranka Kosor as prime minister. Parliament approved her and the new Cabinet which made Kosor the first woman ever to be appointed prime minister. Ever since late 2008, SDP had been leading the polls, however by a narrow margin. After the sudden resignation of Sanader HDZ plummeted in the polls to their lowest level since 1999 when corruption scandals were rocking the party establishment. There was much speculation, since Sanader hadn't given a reason for his departure, whether the Slovenian blockade was the cause for his resignation.

The new premier, faced with a huge deficit and high unemployment, introduced an emergency budget aimed to reduce spending and the national debt. One of the most unpopular austerity measures taken along with the introduction of the budget was a new income tax called the "crisis tax" (krizni porez). In addition, the value-added tax rate was increased from 22% to 23%. The government's handling of finances was unpopular among the public resulting in the Prime Minister's dismal approval rating of 32% by the end of her first month. In the following months Kosor and Pahor met several times, trying to resolve the border dispute. The negotiations resulted in an agreement which led to the continuation of negotiations for the Croatian accession to the European Union. The solution was an Arbitration Agreement which was signed in Stockholm on 4 November 2009, by both countries' Prime Ministers and the president of the EU, Fredrik Reinfeldt.

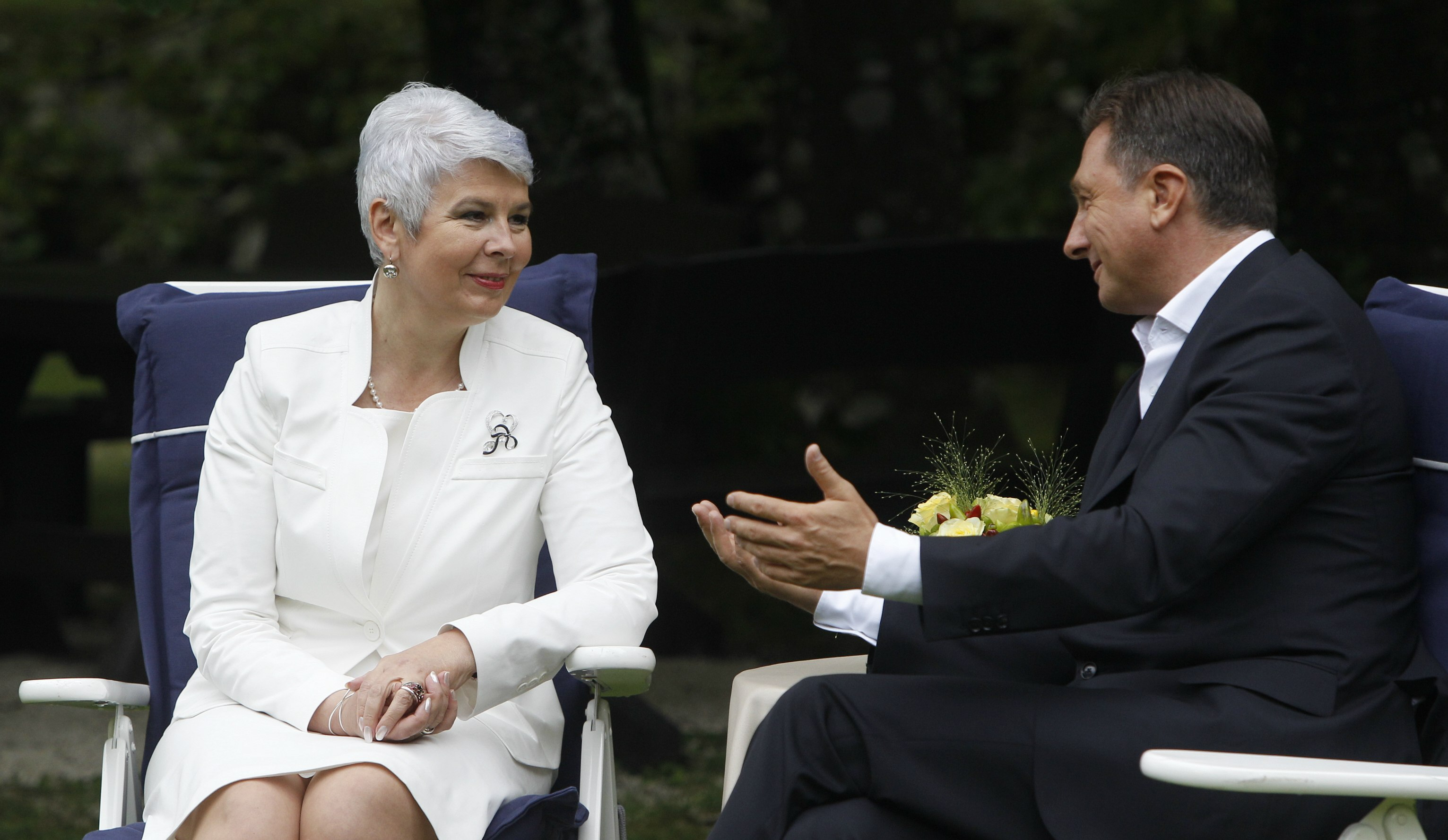
Jadranka Kosor and Borut Pahor developed a close political and personal relationship and were successful in solving the border dispute.

In the last quarter of 2009 many public officials as well as members of the boards of various government agencies became suspected of participating in corrupt activities. Most of the accused were members of the governing HDZ which resulted in great criticism for Kosor, who claimed she was not familiar with any criminal activity from her colleagues in the party. Others, however, praised Kosor and her Government for finally starting to tackle the difficult issue of corruption. The Opposition accused the Prime Minister for political responsibility claiming that it was impossible that Kosor didn't know what was happening around her when she was a Vice President of the government almost seven years before becoming premier. The accusations grew louder as more and more corruption affairs were tied with the former prime minister Ivo Sanader. On 30 October 2009 Damir Polančec, member of the HDZ Presidency, resigned as deputy prime minister and Minister of the Economy following allegations of corruption.

On 3 January 2010 Ivo Sanader announced he was returning to active politics saying it was a mistake he ever left. He accused Kosor and the members of the HDZ Presidency of failed leadership citing Andrija Hebrang's poor result in the first round of the presidential election held just a week earlier. Hebrang achieved an embarrassing 12% claiming third place, the lowest result for an HDZ presidential candidate ever. Ivo Josipović, the candidate of the SDP, won a landslide victory in the resulting runoff on 10 January. Most political pundits as well as the majority of the public believed the true reason of Sanader's surprise return was fear that he would eventually be tied with the numerous corruption scandals which have emerged since he left office. On January 4, the day after Sanader's coup as it was called by the press, the HDZ Presidency decided to expel Sanader from the party. On 9 December 2010 USKOK issued an arrest warrant on Ivo Sanader which resulted in him fleeing the country before his political immunity was stripped by Parliament. He was put on the Interpol wanted list and arrested the following day in Salzburg, Austria.

Throughout 2010, economy topped corruption as the biggest concern of the government. Industry shed tens of thousands of jobs, and unemployment soared. Consumer spending reduced drastically compared to record 2007 levels, causing widespread problems in the trade as well as transport industries. The import/export balance did derive a benefit from a large decrease in imports and a more tempered decrease in exports. The continuing declining standard resulted in a quick fall in both the Prime Minister's as well as government's support.

The recession and high unemployment continued throughout 2011 resulting in many anti-government protests around the country. On 15 April former Croatian general Ante Gotovina was sentenced to 24 years in prison by ICTY after being found guilty of war crimes during Operation Storm. This caused great dissatisfaction in Croatia, especially on the political right. Investigations on the governing party's 'black funds' intensified in 2011 after former HDZ treasurer Branka Pavošević testified to USKOK about the illegal finances used for previous elections, including Jadranka Kosor's own 2005 presidential campaign. The investigation resulted with the Mladen Bajić, the Attorney General, issuing an indictment against HDZ as a legal entity.

On 28 October MPs voted to dissolve Parliament. President of the Republic Ivo Josipović agreed to a dissolution of Sabor on Monday, 31 October and scheduled the election, as previously suspected, for Sunday 4 December.

== Election date ==
The regular parliamentary election after the 2007 Croatian parliamentary election was to be held on or before 11 March 2012, which was the last constitutional deadline.

The unstable political climate following the resignation of the Prime Minister Ivo Sanader in July 2009 prompted many political observers and experts to raise the possibility of an early general election. This did not materialize, rather, the Cabinet of Jadranka Kosor decided to continue with some changes in personnel.

Prime Minister Jadranka Kosor had repeatedly stated in 2010 that they would most likely be held in late 2011, presumably in November. The tentative election date was the last Sunday of November 2011, however many pundits as well as opposition politicians had guessed that the election could be held earlier, in order to coincide with the pending European Union accession referendum. The final date was decided by the ruling parties on 15 July.

The election was officially called when the President of the Republic agreed to a dissolution of Parliament on 31 October, allowing the general election to take place on 4 December. The candidate lists were finalized in the State Election Committee on 17 November, and the official campaign lasted until the election silence on the midnight of 2 December.

== Electoral system ==
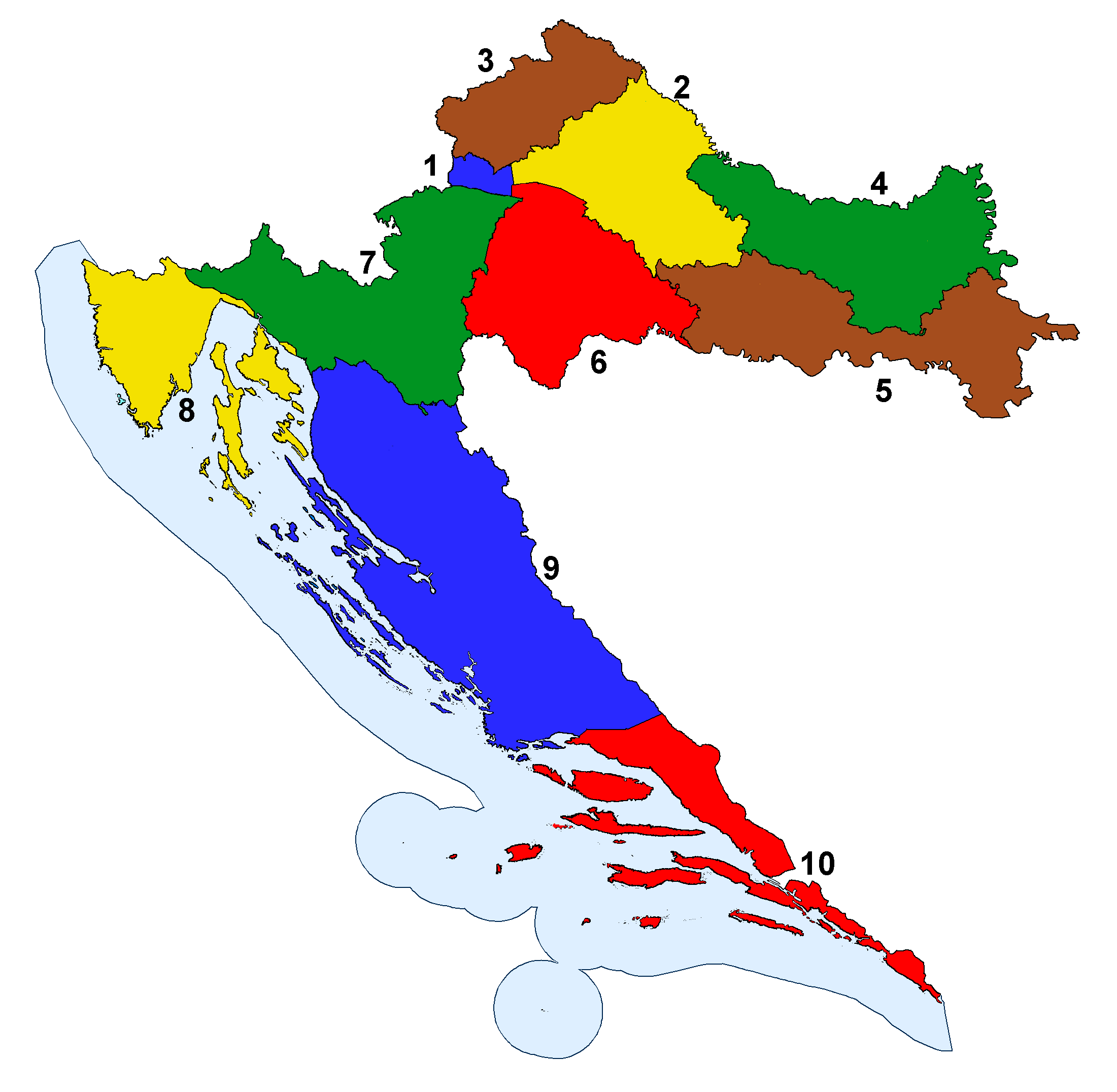
Geographic electoral districts (1–10)

Since 1999 Croatia has been divided into 10 Croatian Parliament electoral districts, named using Roman numerals. These districts are roughly based on geography, but shaped according to the number of voters so that each district holds roughly the same number of registered voters, around 400,000. These districts therefore do not correspond to the borders of top administrative divisions within Croatia and each district contains one or more or parts of several Croatian counties.

Each district sends 14 MPs to the parliament and winning candidates are determined using the party-list proportional representation voting system. This means that parties make lists of 14 candidates to be elected, and seats get allocated to each party in proportion to the number of votes the party receives, with the election threshold set at 5 percent of votes in each district, calculated using the standard D'Hondt formula.

In addition, there are two non-geographical districts. In District XI, 3 members are chosen by proportional representation to represent Croatian citizens residing abroad (this district is commonly referred to as the diaspora electorate). Although all people living outside Croatia are eligible to vote for this list, the majority of voters who turnout for this list traditionally consists of Croats of Bosnia and Herzegovina, the majority of whom hold dual Croatian and Bosnian citizenships. In District XII an additional 8 members are elected to represent the 22 ethnic minorities in Croatia which are legally recognized as such in the Croatian Constitution, with 3 of these seats reserved for the Serbian minority.

Since the seats are allocated according to the proportion of votes received in each district, parties usually nominate senior party officials on top of their lists in districts where they have traditionally enjoyed good levels of support, to ensure that the party's most prominent members win parliamentary seats. All candidates are elected to four-year terms. However, many MPs who are members of post-election ruling coalitions often get appointed to various ministerial and government positions while others serve as city mayors or directors of various government agencies. In such cases they are required by law to put their parliamentary mandate on hiatus for the duration of their other term in office and their seats are then taken by party-appointed deputy MPs.

=== Changes ===
The Constitution and consequently the electoral law has been changed in June 2010 to give District XI 3 fixed seats. In the past, the number of seats given to the district was proportional to the number of voters taking part. In the last elections in 2007, this resulted in 5 seats being allocated to the district.

In December 2010, the Constitutional Court of Croatia decided to inform the Parliament of a necessity to update the electoral unit definitions according to current population data, in accordance with the provisions of the 1999 Law on electoral units.

== Political parties ==
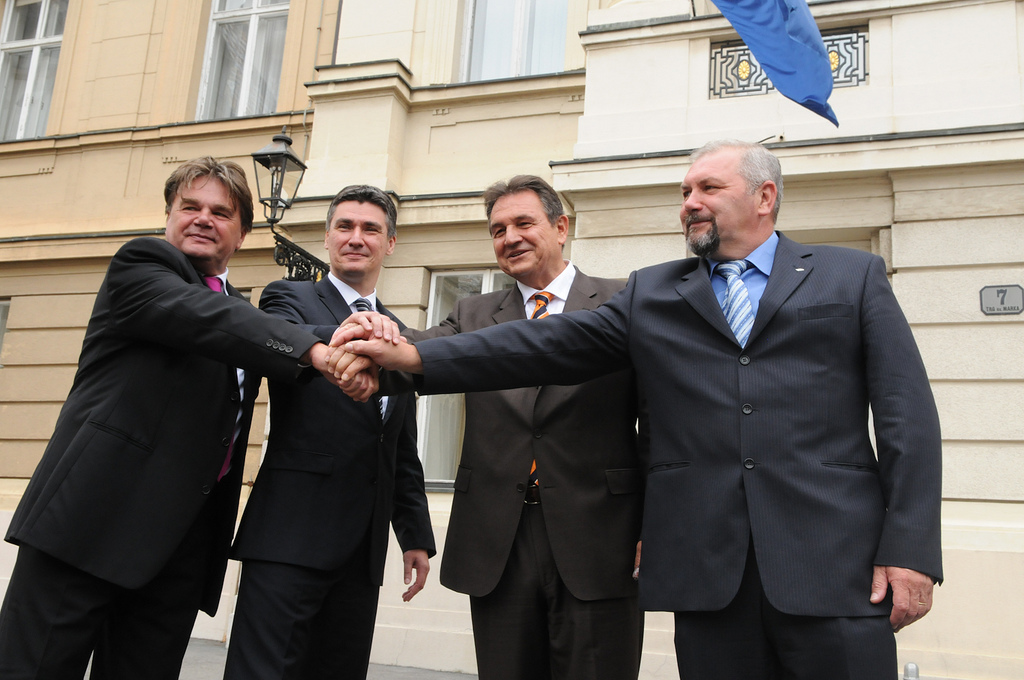
Ivan Jakovčić, Zoran Milanović, Radimir Čačić and Silvano Hrelja announcing the formation of the Kukuriku coalition on 15 July 2011.

The main actors of the election remain entrenched from the previous election cycle – the right-centre block led by the Croatian Democratic Union (HDZ), and the left-centre block led by the Social Democratic Party of Croatia.

The main supporting party of the right-centre block is the Croatian Peasant Party. In 2011, President of Croatian Peasant Party announced that his party would not be part of center right coalition with HDZ.

The main supporting party in the left-centre block is the Croatian People's Party - Liberal Democrats. The left-centre block officially joined an electoral coalition called Alliance for Change in 2010, renamed to Kukuriku coalition in 2011.

In 2010, the Croatian Social Liberal Party lost representation in Parliament because of an internal split between Ivan Čehok, Đurđa Adlešič and others with newly elected party leader Darinko Kosor.

In 2009, former MP Ruža Tomašić (formerly of the Croatian Party of Rights) founded the "Croatian Party of Rights dr. Ante Starčević".

In 2010, MP Dragutin Lesar (formerly of the Croatian People's Party) founded the Croatian Labourists – Labour Party.

In 2011, MP and former candidate for premier Ljubo Jurčić announced he would be leaving the Social Democratic Party and founded his own party to contest the elections.

=== Coalitions and lists ===
- Croatian Democratic Union: independently in districts I-V, VII, VIII
  - With Democratic Centre: district VI
  - With Croatian Citizen Party: districts IX and X
- Social Democratic Party of Croatia – Croatian People's Party – Liberal Democrats – Istrian Democratic Assembly – Croatian Party of Pensioners: all districts
- Croatian Peasant Party: independently in districts II-VI, IX
  - With Green Party and Party of Pensioners: district I, VII, VIII, X

== Campaign ==
The official campaign began on 17 November and ended on 2 December which was the last day when the candidates could present their ideas to the electorate. Lasting a total of 16 days, this was the shortest campaign in history, although unofficial campaigning started much earlier. Kukuriku coalition toured the country presenting their Plan 21, an open document which they sought to present to the public and urge them to share their ideas and criticisms. Throughout October and November they held multiple open forum type debates all over the country. The main focus of their campaign was the economy and low employment numbers. HDZ entered the campaign handicapped by the investigation against the party's black funds, which was made public by the Mladen Bajić, the Attorney General, only a couple of weeks before the official campaign began. The stagnating economic recovery and high unemployment numbers caused by the policies of the Governments of Ivo Sanader and Jadranka Kosor in the past eight years, as well as multiple corruption scandals and a former leader on trial marked the party's campaign. Their main message was that, while the situation may be difficult, HDZ was a party that was best when things are bad and had proven itself in tough times. The rhetoric was mostly patriotic and focused on largely forgotten themes of the 1990s and Franjo Tuđman, the first leader of HDZ. Due to outdated laws Zoran Milanović and Jadranka Kosor, the only two people with a realistic chance of winning the Premiership, were unable to exchange ideas and arguments in a debate.

=== Issues ===
==== Economy ====
The ongoing economic crisis, entering its fourth year, was a major issue in the campaign. The Opposition was persistent in accusing the governing coalition for increasing the country's debt to unprecedented levels as well as being unable to bring new investors and grow entrepreneurship. With the ongoing European sovereign debt crisis, HDZ persisted that Croatia's debt was nowhere near the levels of faltering European economies such as Greece, Italy or Spain. Milanović and Radimir Čačić, the leaders of the Kukuriku coalition, warned of a possible downgrade of Croatia's credit rating which would result in unfavorable interest rates being imposed on Croatian citizens. The issue of whether Croatia would need the assistance of the International Monetary Fund after the election also actualized when Slavko Linić, one of the chief economic strategists of Social Democratic Party, raised the possibility of making an arrangement with the Fund if the economic outlook remained grim. HDZ quickly pounced on that statement arguing that such an arrangement would mean severe cuts and entitlement reform which would endanger the poorest in the country.

Unemployment surged in 2009 and remained at record levels for the next two years. There were no signs of recovery in the jobs market which Kukuriku used as an argument protesting the failed policies of HDZ. Despite fresh and respected faces like Đuro Popijač, Martina Dalić and Domagoj Milošević becoming named ministers in charge of recovering the economy, all sectors saw declines in growth and many factories went into bankruptcy with unpaid workers taking their dissatisfaction to the streets. Most notable were the workers of Kamensko, a former textile giant, which protested because they have not received severance payments or salaries.

==== European Union ====
Every major political party supported Croatian membership in the European Union apart from HSP which demanded a more balanced approach to the European issue claiming the Government's campaign for the EU accession referendum was too biased and focused on a yes vote rather than informative. Kosor claimed her party and her Government was most responsible for the completion of the negotiating process and complained about the lack of support she received from SDP and other opposition parties. Vesna Pusić and Zoran Milanović were both insisting the European issue was a common one and shouldn't be reduced to political bickering.

==== Corruption and organized crime ====
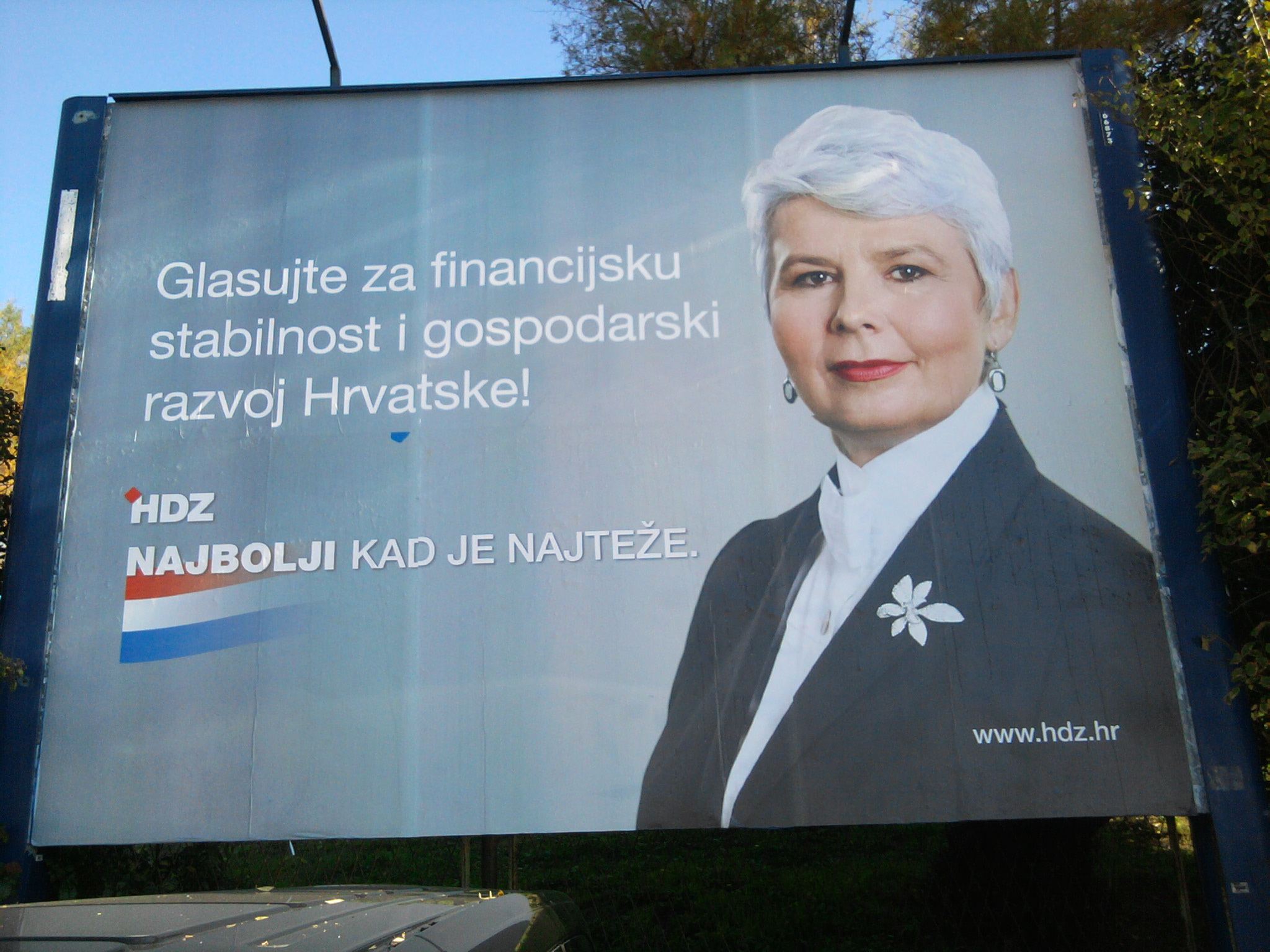
One of HDZ campaign posters featuring Jadranka Kosor. The slogan Best when things are tough is positioned below the party's logo.

With Ivo Sanader, longtime leader of HDZ who ran a highly personalized campaign and won the 2007 general election for HDZ, in prison for conspiracy to commit organized crime, the issue of fighting political and economic corruption surged as one of the main themes of the campaign. Jadranka Kosor and her ministers were arguing they enabled a real fight against organized crime, citing the Sanader case, as well as the arrest of Damir Polančec, former deputy prime minister and numerous other board members and heads of government companies. However, most of the accused were in fact members of HDZ and many political pundits and law experts speculated it was only a matter of time until HDZ as a legal entity was investigated. For years HDZ was under heavy criticism for having the most expensive campaigns without ever logically explaining how the party could afford such elaborate campaign production. Finally, on 27 October, only three weeks before the start of the official campaign, the offices of the Attorney General and USKOK announced HDZ was a party under investigation for organizing with the purpose to commit crime. Opposition MPs, such as Željko Jovanović of SDP who was famous for his claim that the head of HDZ was a criminal organization, demanded the truth about such things as Jadranka Kosor's own failed presidential candidature which was suspected to be financed by 'black funds'. Kosor kept repeating she was unaware of the finances and such party veterans like Vladimir Šeks accused Sanader, who was still in prison, for shifting his own criminal activities on the party. Their main message was that a party can't share collective blame, but that guilt should be placed on individuals who benefited from criminal activities.

=== Expenditure ===
By Croatian law all parties and lists are required to publicly disclose the amount they have raised and spent throughout the official campaign. They submit it through a standardized form to the State Election Committee (Croatian: Državno izborno povjerenstvo, DIP). The final amounts were reported to the DIP and have been reported in Narodne novine. DIP published its report on campaign expenses on 10 February 2012.

Parties and coalitions		Amount raised	Amount spent	Votes	Average spent per vote	Seats	Average spent per seat
Kukuriku coalition	Social Democratic Party of Croatia	10,719,608 kn	10,719,608 kn	958,312	15.16 kn	61	175,731 kn
Kukuriku coalition	Croatian People's Party – Liberal Democrats	2,591,200 kn	2,591,187 kn	958,312	15.16 kn	14	185,084 kn
Kukuriku coalition	Istrian Democratic Assembly	598,382 kn	597,916 kn	958,312	15.16 kn	3	199,638 kn
Kukuriku coalition	Croatian Party of Pensioners	320,000 kn	618,185 kn	958,312	15.16 kn	3	206,061 kn
HDZ, incl. coalitions	Croatian Democratic Union	13,136,735 kn	15,509,605 kn	569,781	27.48 kn	44	352,491 kn
HDZ, incl. coalitions	Croatian Citizen Party	200,000 kn	139,214 kn	569,781	27.48 kn	2	69,607 kn
HDZ, incl. coalitions	Democratic Centre	13,000 kn	11,070 kn	569,781	27.48 kn	1	11,070 kn
Croatian Labourists – Labour Party		882,271 kn	873,333 kn	121,785	7.17 kn	6	145,555 kn
Croatian Democratic Alliance of Slavonia and Baranja		731,088 kn	2,077,903 kn	68,995	30.12 kn	6	346,317 kn
Independent list Ivan Grubišić		230,933 kn	229,778 kn	66,266	3.47 kn	2	114,889 kn
Croatian Peasant Party		5,473,853 kn	5,914,212 kn	71,450	82.77 kn	1	5,914,212 kn
Croatian Party of Rights dr. Ante Starčević		231,088 kn	526,784 kn	66,150	7.96 kn	1	526,784 kn
Croatian Party of Rights		1,752,911 kn	1,752,911 kn	72,360	24.22 kn	0	—
Croatian Social Liberal Party		2,168,733 kn	2,551,121 kn	71,077	35.89 kn	0	—
Bloc Pensioners Together		288,153 kn	347,750 kn	66,239	5.25 kn	0	—
Source: State Election Committee

== Opinion polls ==
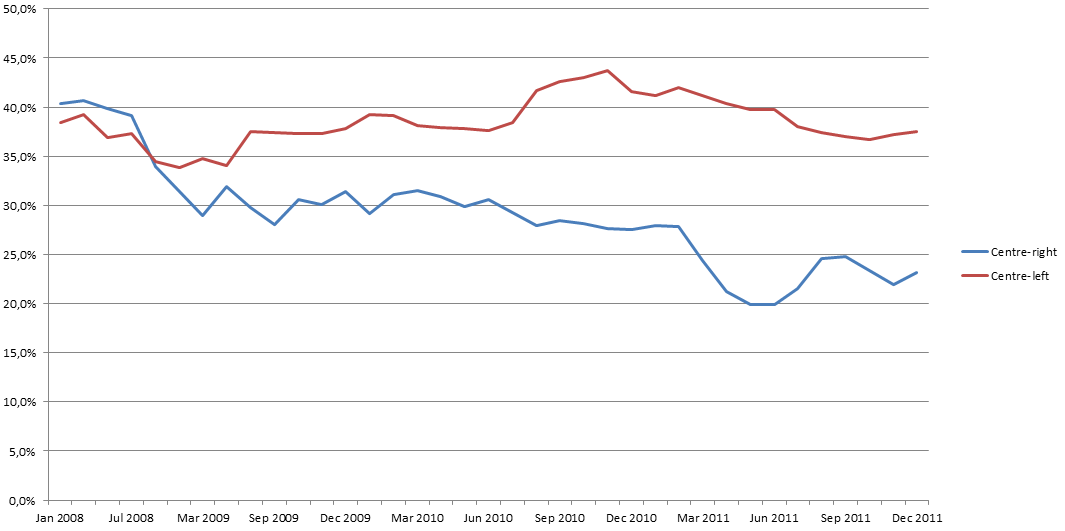
Cro Demoskop polling since January 2008 for the Croatian parliamentary election 2011.

== Results ==
Results by municipality, shaded according to winning party's percentage of the vote.: HDZ—70–80% HDZ—60–70% HDZ—50–60% HDZ—40–50% HDZ—<40% / SDP—>80% SDP—70–80% SDP—60–70% SDP—50–60% SDP—40–50% SDP—<40% / HDSSB—50–60% HDSSB—40–50% HDSSB—<40% HSS—<40% NLSP—40–50% Ladonja—50–60% SDSS—60–70% SDSS—50–60% SDSS—40–50% SDSS—<40%

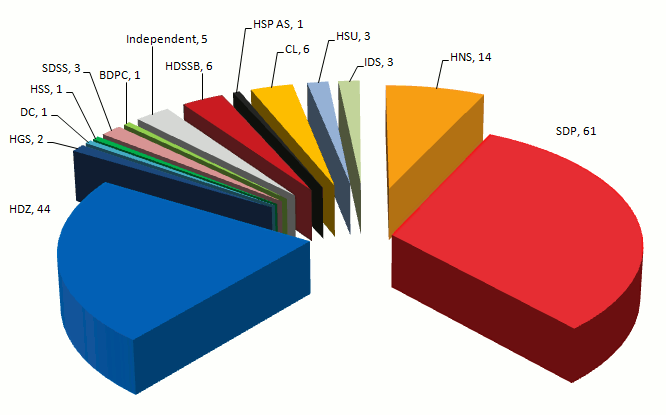
Distribution of seats after the election.

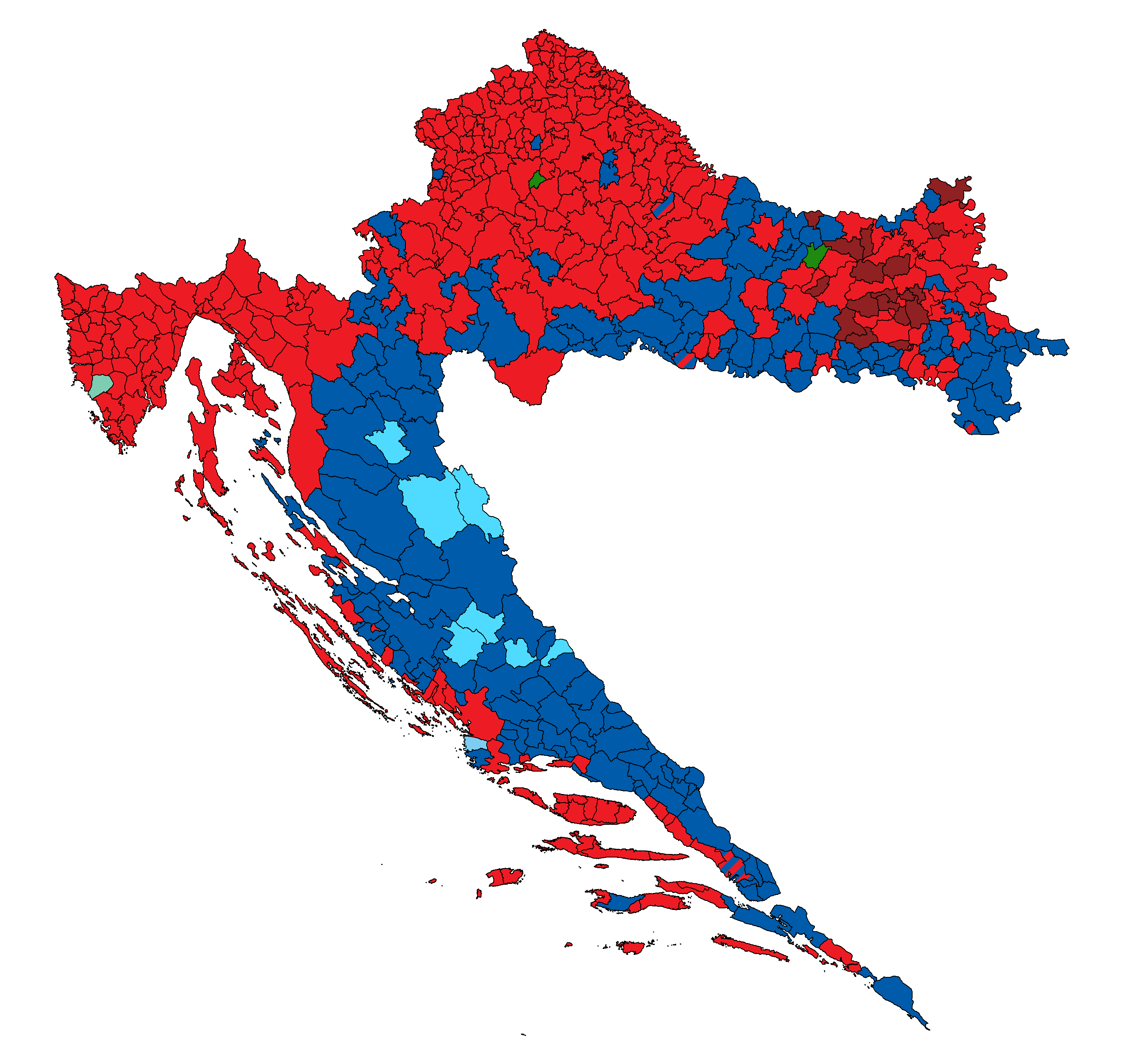
Results of the election based on the majority of votes in each municipality of Croatia Kukuriku Coalition HDZ Coalition HDSSB SDSS HSS NL Stipe Petrina Ladonja

A total of 4,254,121 citizens were eligible to vote, out of which 2,394,638 turned out. This resulted in the lowest turnout, percentage-wise, yet with 56.29% of the electorate fulfilling their constitutional right. However, in district XI, reserved for voters residing abroad, the turnout was just 5.13%, with 21,114 out of possible 411,758 voters turning out. In the ten geographical districts within Croatia the turnout was roughly on par with four years ago. 2,380,209 people cast their vote which resulted in a turnout of 61.95%. Out of the ten units, the largest turnout was in district I, encompassing the largest part of the capital Zagreb, where the turnout was 66.89%. The lowest turnout was in district IX, encompassing central and northern Dalmatia and Lika, with a turnout of 57.06%.

Every single poll from a relevant polling agency released since Sanader's departure showed SDP in the lead, often with a large margin. With the left making a joint appearance, every poll predicted the election would almost certainly result in the victory of the Opposition. On election night, at 7 pm when the polls closed, all three major networks released projections of the new Parliament, based on exit polls of over 25,000 people throughout the day. The projections showed Kukuriku with an insurmountable lead over the governing parties, winning 83 seats, well over the 76 needed to form a majority. HDZ-HGS-DC were projected to have 40 seats, not including the 3 seats from district XI which HDZ wins in every election, HSS 2, Labour and HDSSB both 6. Some 30 minutes later updated totals (30,000 polled) showed Kukuriku losing one seat to a regional party, but with 82 seats still winning a clear mandate. The reaction from the presumed victors was cautiously optimistic. Four years ago exit polls showed SDP leading, however by a narrow margin, but HDZ ultimately won 5 seats more in the ten districts. With a difference of 42, well beyond the statistical margin of error, there was little doubt who won the election, however reactions ranged from caution to disbelief. HDZ spokespeople claimed, as with every negative poll, conservative voters rarely participate in polling and expressed confidence in a more favorable result. Indeed, many members of the winning coalition were employing the press and their supporters to wait for official results, but claimed the difference between the two alliances was too great to be overcome. As 9 pm approached, the first actual results began to arrive, confirming the results of the exit polls, with few changes. As the vote count progressed, the preliminary results and especially the preliminary seat calculations varied. HSLS and HSP, both parliamentary parties since their foundation, received a number of votes close to the election threshold, but ended without representation. HSS barely won a single seat with its president, Josip Friščić, the only one who entered Parliament.

The four centre-left Opposition parties, contesting the election united as the Kukuriku coalition, received their best result ever, with SDP winning 61 seats meaning that for the first time since Independence they will be the largest single party in Parliament, Croatian People's Party – Liberal Democrats winning 14, IDS 3 and Croatian Party of Pensioners also 3. Despite the record number of seats won, the coalition received 958,312 votes, or 40.0%, compared to 2007 when they contested the election separately and received 1,083,488, or 43.6%. The newly formed Labour Party, led by former HNS party member Dragutin Lesar, was a major surprise of the election. It won 6 seats, an unusual feat from a party outcast in a country with a stable political system where independent newcomers rarely win a significant proportion of the vote. Another surprise was the independent candidate Ivan Grubišić, a former Roman Catholic priest who ran on a campaign of restoring ethics and integrity to politics. He won 2 seats in his tenth electoral district, largely from Split, the second largest city in the country. Croatian Democratic Alliance of Slavonia and Baranja (HDSSB), a regional rightist party from Slavonia, contested the election in districts IV and V and achieved an unexpected 6 seats, despite most polls before the election giving them a maximum of 5 seats. They ran on a campaign of decentralization and regionalism and a very vocal opposition to HDZ.

HDZ, after eight years in Government and 20 as the largest single party, received an historic blow with only 44 seats, two less than the 2000 election loss, and only 23.5% of the popular vote, their lowest share yet. By comparison, in 2000 HDZ received 790,728 votes compared to only 563,215 in this election cycle. The turnout twelve years ago was higher, but the result was still 3.4 percentage points lower than their, until 2011, lowest point. HDZ didn't even contest the election individually, as in 2000, but in coalition with the mayor of Split Željko Kerum's Croatian Citizen Party and Vesna Škare Ožbolt's Democratic Centre, which won 2 and 1 seats respectively. The main coalition partner of HDZ since 2007 was the Croatian Peasant Party which also received their worst result yet, being reduced to just 1 MP. In fact, two ministers from HSS, serving since the last election, Damir Bajs and Božidar Pankretić both failed to cross the threshold in their respective units. Another HDZ minister, Radovan Fuchs, also failed to enter Parliament.

Party	Votes	%	Seats
Kukuriku Coalition (SDP–HNS–LD–IDS–HSU)	958,318	40.72	80
HDZ Coalition (HDZ–HGS–DC)	563,215	23.93	47
Croatian Labourists – Labour Party	121,785	5.17	6
Croatian Party of Rights	79,656	3.38	0
HSLS–ZDS	73,225	3.11	0
HSS–ZS–SP	73,742	3.13	1
Croatian Democratic Alliance of Slavonia and Baranja	68,995	2.93	6
BUZ–PGS–HRS	66,957	2.85	0
HSP AS–HČSP	66,150	2.81	1
Croatian Growth	29,797	1.27	0
AM–RI–SUH–ASH	24,402	1.04	0
ABH–HDS–JH	14,403	0.61	0
A-HSS–SP–DPS	13,653	0.58	0
Ladonja	12,010	0.51	0
Women's Democratic Party	9,108	0.39	0
Green List	8,575	0.36	0
Independent Democratic Serb Party	7,795	0.33	0
Authentic Croatian Party of Rights	5,768	0.25	0
Socialist Labour Party of Croatia	5,172	0.22	0
AMD–HSM	4,677	0.20	0
Democratic Party of Slavonia Plain	3,953	0.17	0
Croatian Democratic Peasant Party	3,891	0.17	0
Alphabet of Democracy	3,143	0.13	0
Croatian Green Party–Eco Green Alliance	3,054	0.13	0
Zagreb Independent List	3,020	0.13	0
Greens Together	2,883	0.12	0
21st Century Croatia	2,465	0.10	0
I Love Croatia	2,224	0.09	0
National Democrats	2,046	0.09	0
Croatian Union Party	1,897	0.08	0
Zagorje Party	1,730	0.07	0
Međimurje Democratic Alliance	1,667	0.07	0
Istrian Independent Social Democratic Party	1,660	0.07	0
Family Party	1,566	0.07	0
Greens	1,517	0.06	0
Voice of Reason	1,102	0.05	0
Croatian European Party	878	0.04	0
Croatian Christian Democratic Union	585	0.02	0
New Croatia	500	0.02	0
Croatia Greens	477	0.02	0
Dalmatian Liberal Party	445	0.02	0
Socialist Party of Croatia	271	0.01	0
Independents	105,088	4.47	2
National minorities			8
Total	2,353,465	100.00	151
Valid votes	2,353,465	98.28	
Invalid/blank votes	41,173	1.72	
Total votes	2,394,638	100.00	
Registered voters/turnout	4,254,121	56.29	
Source: State Election Committee; Vjesnik

=== Turnout ===
District	I	II	III	IV	V	VI	VII	VIII	IX	X	Total I-X	XI	XII	Total
Voters total	358,750	403,716	364,332	333,927	367,654	352,471	413,148	385,376	440,597	422,392	3,842,363	411,758	250,130	4,504,251
Votes cast	239,962	249,595	233,700	209,903	216,732	218,975	267,207	238,199	251,409	254,527	2,380,209	21,114	45,508	2,446,831
Turnout	66.89%	61.82%	64.14%	62.86%	58.95%	62.13%	64.68%	61.81%	57.06%	60.26%	61.95%	5.13%	18.19%	54.32%

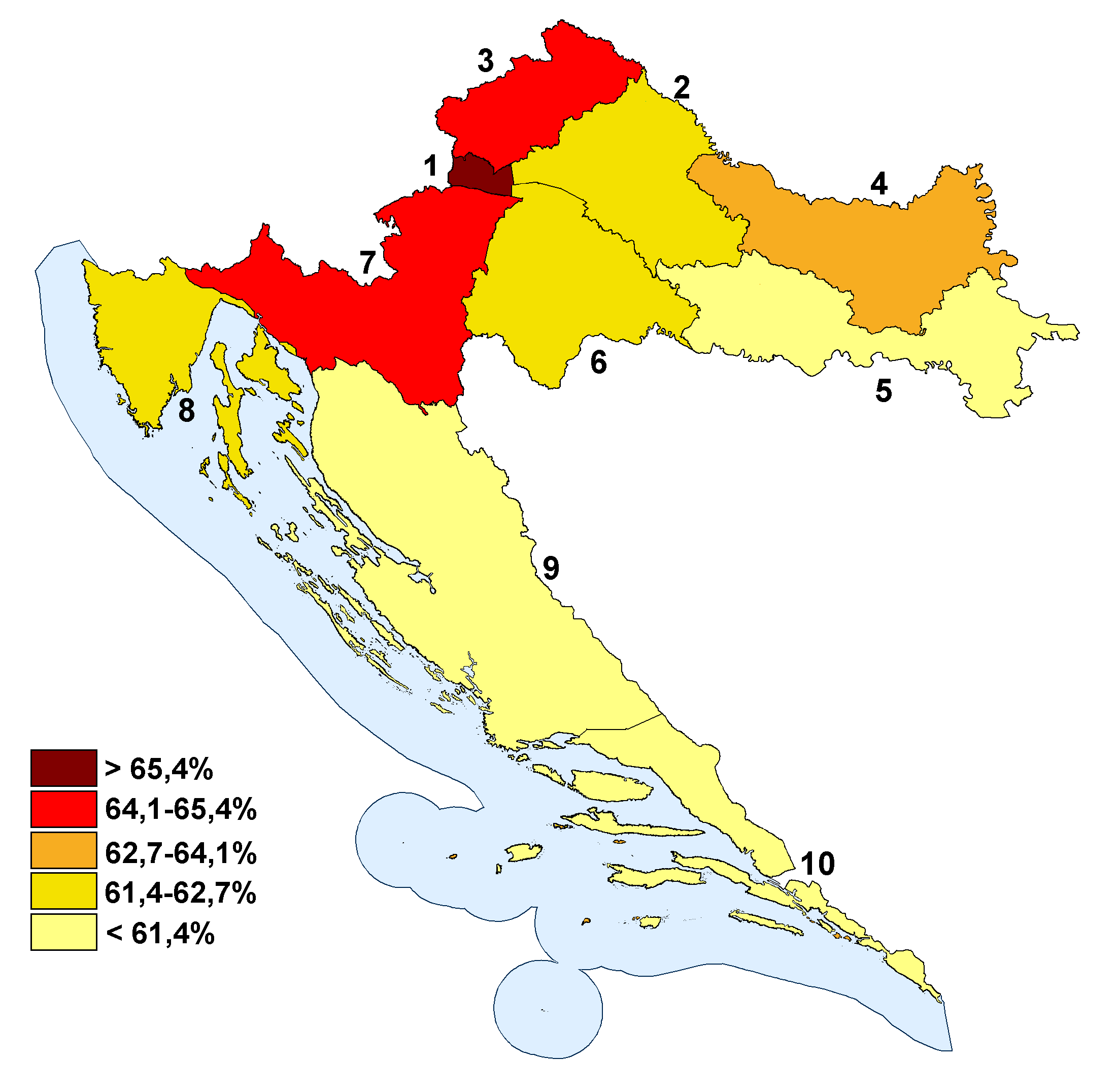
Election turnout for each electoral district

=== By electoral district ===
Party / District	I	II	III	IV	V	VI	VII	VIII	IX	X	XI	XII
SDP/HNS-LD/IDS/HSU	9	8	10	6	6	9	9	11	6	6	—	1
HDZ / HDZ-DC / HDZ-HGS	4	4	3	4	6	4	4	2	8	5	3	—
Labour	1	1	1	0	0	1	1	1	0	0	—	—
HDSSB	—	—	—	4	2	—	—	—	—	—	—	—
SDSS	—	—	—	—	—	—	—	—	0	—	—	3
Independent list Ivan Grubišić	0	0	0	0	—	0	0	0	0	2	—	—
HSS	0	1	0	0	0	0	0	0	0	0	—	
HSP-AS	0	0	0	0	0	0	0	0	0	1	0	—
Other national minority	—	—	—	—	—	—	—	—	—	—	—	4

National minorities elected 8 representatives through a separate election system: Milorad Pupovac (65,1% of votes), Vojislav Stanimirović (63,5%) and Jovo Vuković (54,8%) for the Serb national minority, Deneš Šoja (51,5%) for the Hungarian minority, Furio Radin (unopposed) for the Italian minority, Vladimir Bilek (45,4%) for the Czech and Slovak minorities, Veljko Kajtazi (18,9%) for the Austrian, Bulgarian, German, Jewish, Polish, Roma, Romanian, Rusyn, Russian, Turkish, Ukrainian, Vlach minorities and Nedžad Hodžić (26,5%) for the Albanian, Bosniak, Macedonian, Montenegrin and Slovene minorities.

== Aftermath ==
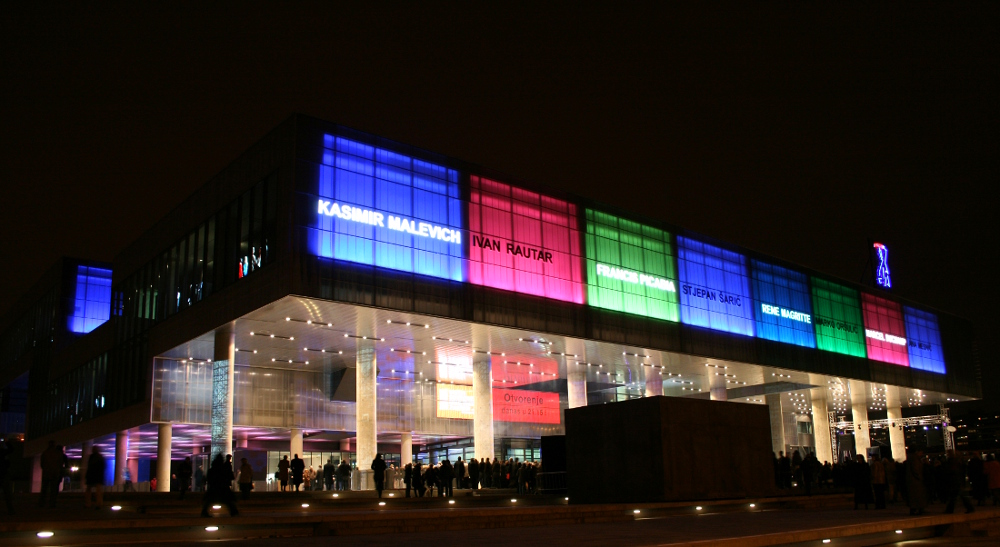
The Museum of Contemporary Art where the Kukuriku coalition celebrated their victory.

It is a tradition in Croatia that the head of the State Election Commission gives a press conference at midnight every election night and, after they present the results, the leaders of the main parties speak to their supporters. Jadranka Kosor, the leader of HDZ, decided to break tradition and spoke to the crowd gathered in Meštrović Pavilion, where the party was watching the returns, only 15 minutes before midnight. The speech was mostly aimed at disappointed party members, saddened by the worst result the party ever achieved. She said the party was going through the hardest period in its history and blamed the media for their bias against HDZ citing 'impossible conditions' in which the campaign was held. Without congratulating her opponent, or acknowledging criminal activities that had diminished the party's reputation, she claimed HDZ would return stronger than ever and win the next general election, whenever it would be held. Members of Civic Action, a non-governmental organization usually very critical towards the governing party, gathered in front of the pavilion and lit candles, insinuating the death of HDZ.

Celebrating victory in the Museum of Contemporary Art, members of the Kukuriku coalition were joined by former President of the Republic Stipe Mesić, former Prime Minister Josip Manolić, famous UFC fighter Mirko Filipović, Ivo Sanader's attorneys, United States Ambassador to Croatia James Foley and many other dignitaries and celebrities. After midnight, when more than 50% of the vote was counted and it was obvious he had won a clear majority, Prime Minister-to-be Zoran Milanović spoke to the crowd promising a fairer, more transparent and more modern government. Unlike his counterpart, he thanked Kosor and her associates for their service and urged all parties with Croatia's best interest at heart to work together to overcome the difficult days facing the country.

=== Government formation ===
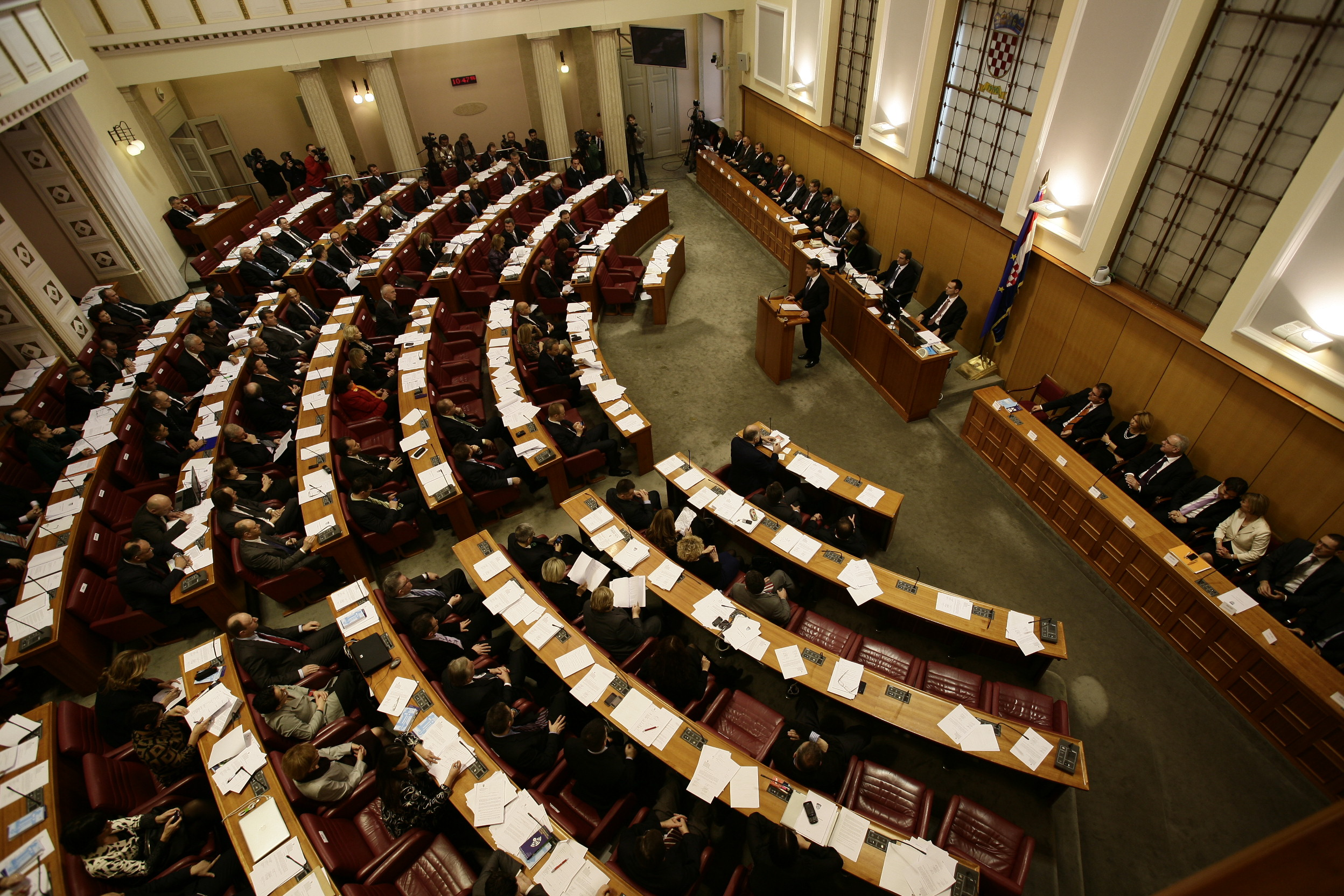
Milanović presenting his cabinet to Parliament ahead of the confidence vote.

Unlike the government formation talks in 2007 when the two political blocks were roughly even in the number of seats won, but with neither being able to form a majority without extensive negotiations with smaller parties, the resounding victory of the centre-left coalition in this election cycle left no doubt as to who would form the government. Since the Kukuriku coalition won an outright majority, there was no need for negotiations with other parties and the President of the Republic had no reason to call the leaders of the parties for coalition talks as four years ago. On 14 December, ten days after the election and immediately after the president of the State Election Commission came to Pantovčak and handed him the official and final results, president Ivo Josipović invited Zoran Milanović to his office and asked him to form a government.

Milanović presented his cabinet to Parliament on 23 December, 19 days after the election. The discussion resulted with 89 members, 81 Kukuriku and 8 national minority MPs, voting in favour of the Milanović cabinet. The transition to power occurred the following evening when Jadranka Kosor welcomed Milanović to the government's official meeting place, Banski dvori, opposite the Sabor building on St. Mark's Square and handed him the necessary papers and documents.

By taking office at the age of 45, Zoran Milanović became the second youngest prime minister since Croatia's independence. In addition, his cabinet also became the youngest, with an average minister's age being 48. Cabinet members came from three out of the four parties of the winning coalition, leaving only the single-issue Croatian Party of Pensioners (HSU) without representation.
