= Ivan Turudić =

Attorney General of Croatia since 2024

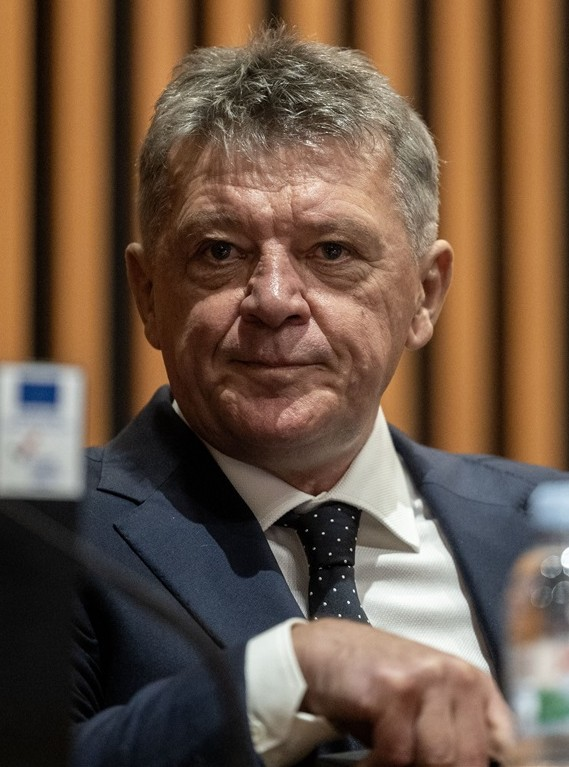
- Turudić in 2024

Attorney General of Croatia
- Incumbent
- Assumed office 27 May 2024
- Prime Minister: Andrej Plenković
- Preceded by: Zlata Hrvoj Šipek

Personal details
- Born: 2 June 1962 (age 64) Lug Gradinski (Gradina), PR Croatia, FPR Yugoslavia
- Spouse: Tatjana Pavelić Turudić
- Children: 2
- Education: University of Zagreb

Ivan Turudić (born 2 June 1962) is a Croatian jurist and attorney who has served as Attorney General of the Republic of Croatia since 2024. Before being elected as attorney general, he worked as a judge at the County Court in Zagreb from 2000 to 2021, known for his court hearings on former Prime Minister Ivo Sanader, and as a judge at the High Criminal Court of Croatia from 2021 to 2024.

== Early life and education ==
Ivan Turudić was born in 1962 in Lug Gradinski near the town of Virovitica, in a working-class family with three sisters. After finishing high school in Virovitica, he went to study law at the University of Zagreb. His thesis was on the topic of international terrorism, written with the help of his mentor, professor Zvonimir Šeparović. He graduated from the Faculty of Law, and two years later passed the bar exam. Turudić was a volunteer fighter in the Croatian War of Independence.

== Career ==
Turudić completed his internship at the Municipal Court in Virovitica, after which he joined to fight in the Croatian War of Independence. He got a job in 1991 at the same court, where he would later be promoted to president. In 1998, he switched to the County Court in Virovitica, where he was also appointed president.

Parallel to that, from 1999 to 2000, Turudić worked as an assistant to the Minister of Justice Zvonimir Šeparović, his professor. After that, in 2000, he moved to the County Court in Zagreb working in various departments: first as an investigating judge for two years, before switching to the criminal law department. Turudić has been close with the HDZ since the 90s.

In 2005, he ran for president of the county court, but was rejected by the Minister of Justice Vesna Škare-Ožbolt. In 2009, in the criminal law department, he became president of the USKOK department. In 2012, after a successful bid, he was elected as president of the County Court in Zagreb, serving in that position until 2016, and again from 2017 to 2021.

During his tenure, he was a judge in the trials of multiple prominent figures, including Ivo Sanader, Minister of Economy Damir Polančec, representative to the UN Neven Jurica, Hrvoje Petrač and others. In 2021, Turudić became a judge at the High Criminal Court of Croatia, and worked there until his appointment as attorney general in 2024.

In 2015, Turudić and his family visited veterans protesting in front of the Ministry of Croatian Veterans. To show his support for the protestors, in March, he proposed introducing changes to the criminal code "which should be widely debated, in which lawyers and politicians, experts and the general public would express their views", according to which denying the official narrative about the Croatian War of Independence would be a criminal offense and carry a sentence of three or five years in prison.

In 2016, he chaired the revision process that completely overturned the verdict of the trial of Aloysius Stepinac, saying that it "violated the principle of the right to a fair trial, appeal, and a reasoned court decision". The revision was requested by Stepinac's nephew, and welcomed by the Croatian Democratic Union and the Archdiocese of Zagreb. Critics pointed out that Turudić had made his decision in a week, despite Stepinac's trial having almost 4000 pages of records.

=== Attorney General of Croatia ===
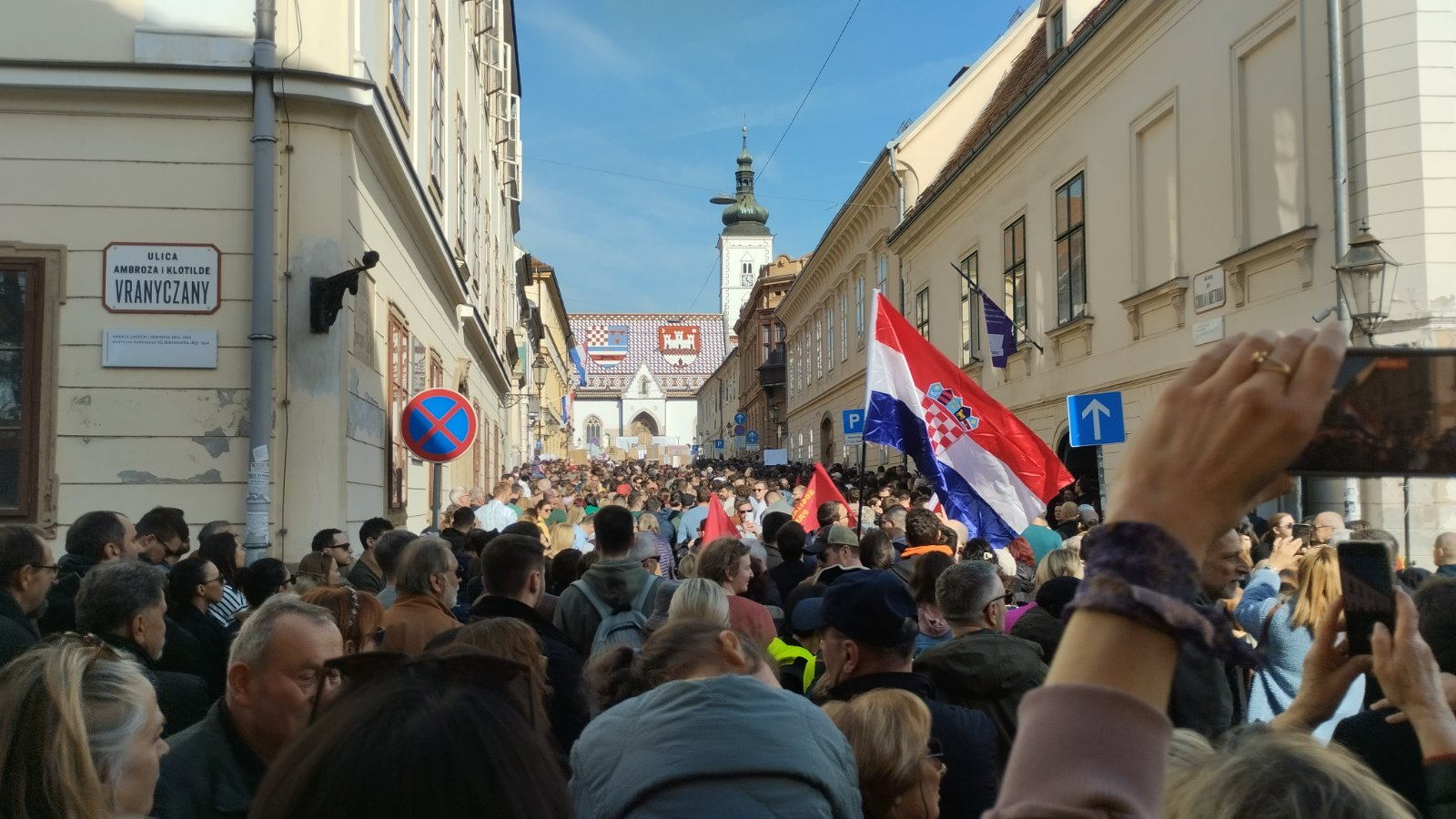
Protest on St Mark's Square following the confirmation of Turudić as Attorney General, February 2024

Turudić applied for Attorney General together with three more candidates. After questioning by the State Attorney's Council, the Judiciary Committee, and the cabinet of Prime Minister Andrej Plenković, on 4 January 2024, it was announced that Turudić would be nominated for the position. On 7 February, he was confirmed in the Parliament in a 78–60 vote. His confirmation sparked a protest on St Mark's Square, supported mostly by left-leaning parties. His mandate began on 27 May 2024, after a transfer of power from Zlata Hrvoj Šipek.

== Controversies ==
=== Meetings with Zdravko Mamić ===
In 2015, Turudić, then president of the County Court in Zagreb, met several times with Zdravko Mamić, former president of Dinamo Zagreb who had ongoing trials in Osijek. They went on several car rides and private meetings at night, back when Turudić was president of the County Court in Zagreb. At first, he denied their meetings, but later admitted it and confirmed that they, among other things, talked about Mamić's case. In 2024, the Supreme Court of the Republic of Croatia filed a case against Turudić for violating the Code of Judicial Ethics. The outcome likely won't have any effect on him because he became the Attorney General soon after.

=== Arrest of Health Minister Vili Beroš ===
On 15 November 2024, following an investigation, the Office for the Suppression of Corruption and Organised Crime (USKOK) issued an arrest warrant for Minister of Health Vili Beroš for trading in influence, together with two more people. Almost immediately after, it was revealed that the European Public Prosecutor's Office (EPPO) was also investigating Beroš, both agencies being unaware of each other's investigation. EPPO's investigation was broader, involving eight people instead of three, and resulted in Beroš facing an additional charge of accepting bribes. They asked the State Attorney's Office to hand them over the investigation, which Turudić declined, saying that "USKOK believed it had jurisdiction". The opposition in the Parliament criticized the move, claiming it protected Beroš, and European Chief Prosecutor Laura Codruța Kövesi disagreed with Turudić, saying that a European court should determine the jurisdiction and not the attorney general.

== Personal life ==
Ivan Turudić is married to gynecologist Tatjana Pavelić Turudić. They have two children, a daughter and a son. Both children went to university in the United States. Some of Turudić's properties include a flat in Zagreb, where he lives, and three vineyards near Virovitica.
