= State Attorney's Office of the Republic of Croatia =

Highest prosecutor's office in Croatia

State Attorney's Office of the Republic of Croatia Državno odvjetništvo Republike Hrvatske
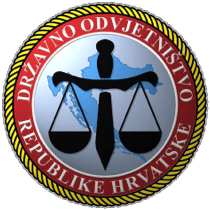
- Official seal

Office overview
- Formed: 7 December 1990; 35 years ago
- Type: Judicial body
- Headquarters: Gajeva 30a, Zagreb, Croatia
- Employees: c. 1,700 (2024)
- Budget: €76.8 million (2024 plan)
- Website: dorh.hr

Attorney General
- Currently: Ivan Turudić since 27 May 2024

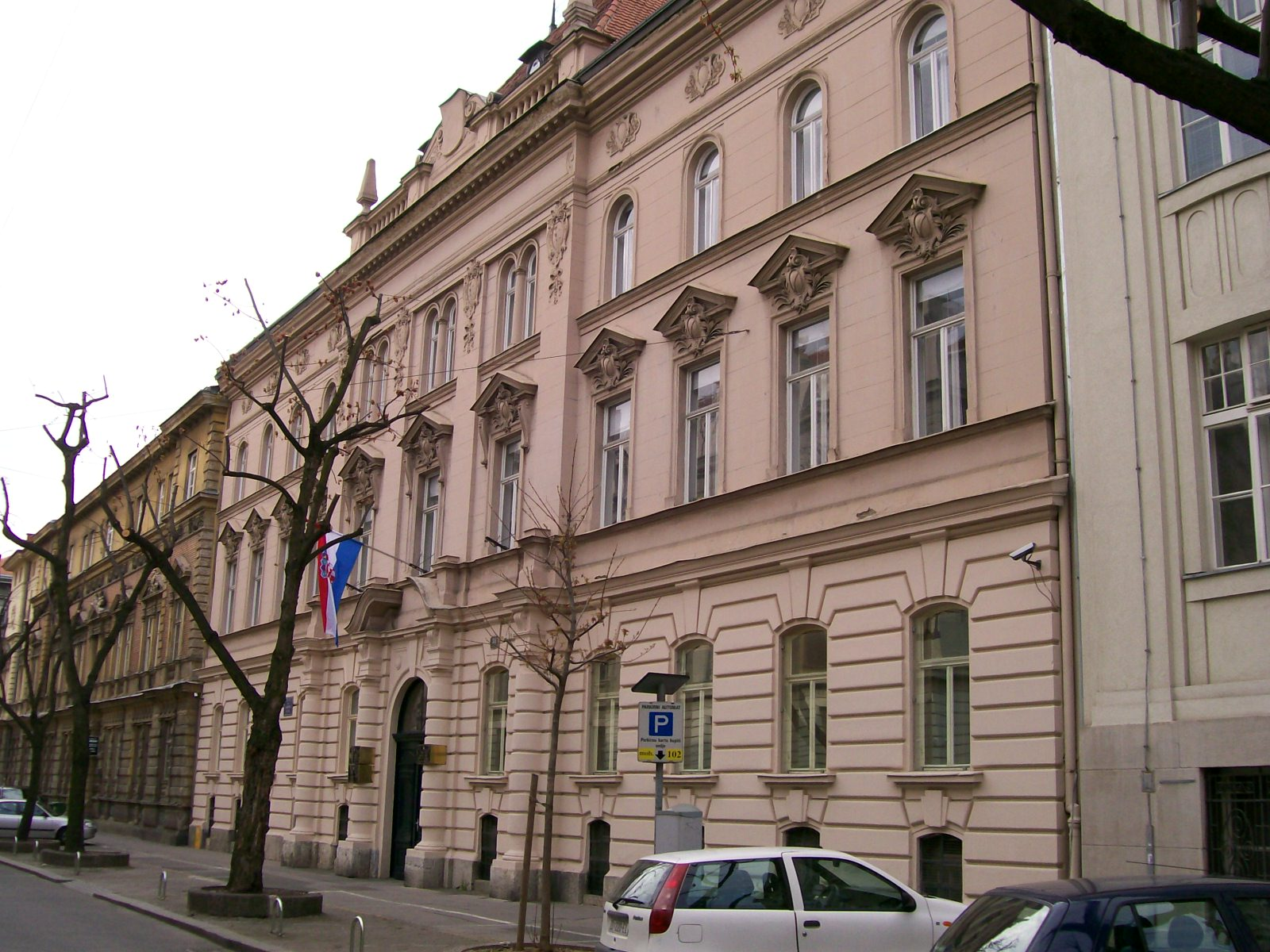
DORH headquarters in Zagreb

State Attorney's Office of the Republic of Croatia (Croatian: Državno odvjetništvo Republike Hrvatske or DORH) is an autonomous and independent judicial body empowered and duty-bound to instigate prosecution of perpetrators of criminal and other penal offences, to initiate legal measures to protect the property of the Republic of Croatia and to apply legal remedies to protect the Croatian Constitution and laws.

DORH is a unique judicial body that has authority over the whole Croatian territory. Its head is an Attorney General who has deputies. DORH headquarters are in Zagreb, but it is also decentralized and is thus divided into 26 municipal and 15 county offices. Nevertheless, it is a strictly hierarchically structured body, so municipal offices are subordinated to the county offices, while county offices are subordinated to the central office in Zagreb. In addition, Croatian State Prosecutor's Office for the Suppression of Organized Crime and Corruption (USKOK) is a special body of DORH specialized in investigations related to corruption and organized crime.

== Organization and jurisdiction ==
Organization and jurisdiction of DORH are regulated with The Act on the State Attorney's Office.

The State Attorney's Office competent in criminal proceedings is obligated to prosecute and represent the charges against perpetrators of criminal acts which are prosecuted ex officio or upon the proposal and undertake other actions defined by the law. The competent State Attorney's Office acts in misdemeanor proceedings in line with the powers granted to it under the law. A competent State Attorney's Office represents the Republic of Croatia in the protection of assets and other rights in the civil and administrative matters, unless otherwise determined by law or the decision of a competent state body.

The Municipal Offices represent Croatia in the proceedings before a municipal court, a misdemeanor court and administrative bodies, County Offices represent Croatia in the proceedings before a county, administrative and commercial court, while the Central Office represents Croatia, and oversees and protects the rule of law and proceeds with all actions before the Supreme Court, Constitutional Court, High Administrative Court, High Commercial Court, High Misdemeanor Court, and international and foreign justice and other bodies.

== Structure of DORH ==
DORH consist of:

- (Central) State Attorney's Office of the Republic of Croatia (DORH)
- 15 county State Attorney's Offices (in Bjelovar, Dubrovnik, Karlovac, Osijek, Pula, Rijeka, Sisak, Slavonski Brod, Split, Šibenik, Varaždin, Velika Gorica, Vukovar, Zadar, Zagreb) (ŽDO)
- 26 municipal State Attorney's Offices (ODO)
- Croatian State Prosecutor's Office for the Suppression of Organized Crime and Corruption (USKOK)

=== Internal structure of the central office ===
The Central office has four departments:

1. Criminal - responsible for taking legal actions against the perpetrators of crimes and other criminal activities
2. Civil and Administrative - responsible for taking legal actions to protect the assets of Croatia, providing legal remedies to protect the Constitution and the laws, representing Croatia in proceedings before courts and administrative bodies, and protecting Croatian property and legal interests
3. for Internal Audit
4. for International Legal Assistance and Cooperation

=== Attorney General and deputies ===
Attorney General is managing and representing State Attorney's Office. According to The Act on the State Attorney's Office, any Croatian citizen meeting the general and special requirements for the appointment of a deputy in the State Attorney's Office may be appointed as Attorney General. Attorney General is appointed for a four-year term by the Croatian Parliament upon the motion of the Croatian Government and following a prior opinion of the Parliament's Justice Committee. He may be reappointed to the same office numerous times, but if that doesn't happen he has a right to either leave the Office or to continue to work as a deputy attorney. County and Municipal State Attorneys are appointed for a four-year term by the National State Attorney Council consisting of seven deputy state attorneys (elected among and by them from the Office of Attorney General, from county and municipal offices), two university professors of law (chosen by the Croatian universities) and two MPs (one of whom must be from the opposition parties); with a prior opinion issued by the Minister of Justice and DORH. County State Attorneys are appointed from among the state attorneys and deputies in the county state attorney's offices or a higher state attorney's office with five years of working experience in the Office. Deputy state attorneys (in the Office of the Attorney General, in the county and municipal state attorney's offices) are appointed by the National State Attorney Council, which also conducts disciplinary proceedings concerning state attorneys and their deputies (except the Attorney General).

A state attorney terminates his office when deceased, when he has attained the age of 70 years, and upon the dismissal. A state attorney can be released from duty if he has exercised his duties in an illegal, untimely and insufficiently expert manner; the state attorney office he represents fails to achieve satisfactory results; he fails to perform the duties in a state attorney office or justice administration in conformity with the regulations or fails to perform them in due time; has failed to file a request for a disciplinary proceeding in the matters determined by law; he commits an action corresponding to the action referred to under Article 84 of The Act on the State Attorney's Office; the grounds for the dismissal referred to under Article 69, Paragraph 1, items 1 to 4 of The Act on the State Attorney's Office exist. The motion for the dismissal of the State Attorney's General may be filed by the Government. The final verdict is in the hands of the Parliament, that has to obtain an opinion from the Justice Committee.

=== List of State Attorneys General ===
Attorney General
#	Name	Took office	Left office
1	Željko Olujić	7 December 1990	15 April 1992
2	Vladimir Šeks	10 April 1992	12 August 1992
3	Stjepan Herceg	24 September 1992	28 December 1993
4	Krunoslav Olujić	29 December 1993	28 November 1994
5	Marijan Hranjski	29 November 1994^{[a]}	12 May 2000
/	Slavko Zadnik (acting)	12 May 2000	7 February 2001
6	Radovan Ortynski	8 February 2001	23 April 2002
7	Mladen Bajić	24 April 2002^{[b]}	23 April 2014
8	Dinko Cvitan	24 April 2014	19 April 2018
9	Dražen Jelenić	20 April 2018	19 February 2020
10	Zlata Hrvoj-Šipek	18 May 2020	26 May 2024
11	Ivan Turudić	27 May 2024	Incumbent

== Funds ==
Funds for the operation of the State Attorney's Office are provided from the state budget. The amount is provided according to the provisions that apply to the provision of funds for the courts and have to be secured in such an amount to enable a regular execution of all the tasks in the State Attorney's Office. The amount is determined on the basis of a proposal made by the State Attorney. The request has to include an estimate of the workload of regular and temporary tasks, the number of officials, servants, and employees required and other indicators relevant to the determination of a number of funds required. In 2013, Office had annual budget of 299,816,050 HRK (c. €40,000).

== Notes ==
^a He was reelected on 16 November 1995, and took office on 30 November 1995.

^b He was reelected on 3 March 2006 and 12 February 2010.
