= Dinko Cvitan =

Croatian lawyer

Attorney General of Croatia
- In office 24 April 2014 – 24 April 2018
- Prime Minister: Zoran Milanović; Tihomir Orešković; Andrej Plenković
- Preceded by: Mladen Bajić
- Succeeded by: Dražen Jelenić

Director of USKOK
- In office 2 November 2005 – 24 April 2014
- Preceded by: Željko Žganjer
- Succeeded by: Tamara Laptoš

Personal details
- Born: 1958 (age 67–68) Zagreb, SR Croatia, SFR Yugoslavia (modern Croatia)
- Education: University of Zagreb

Dinko Cvitan is a Croatian lawyer who served as the Attorney General of Croatia between 24 April 2014 and 20 April 2018, had previously served as director of the Croatian State Prosecutor's Office for the Suppression of Organized Crime and Corruption.

== Early life and education ==
Dinko Cvitan was born in Zagreb in 1958 where he finished elementary and high school, after which he enrolled in Zagreb Faculty of Law from which he graduated in 1983.

== Career ==
After graduation, Cvitan started working as a trainee at the Zagreb Municipal Court. In 1985, he passed the bar exam, and after that started working at the Zagreb Municipal State Attorney's Office where he was appointed Deputy Municipal State Attorney in 1986. Since 1991, he worked as a lawyer in a private practice, first in Daruvar and after the outbreak of Croatian War of Independence, in Zagreb. In 1999, he started working as the director of legal affairs at the insurance company Sunce osiguranje d.d. In 2003, Cvitan returned to the State's Attorney Office. In August 2003, he was promoted to a Deputy County Prosecutor, but immediately after that he was assigned the duties of Deputy Director of USKOK. In February 2004, he received a permanent appointment as deputy director of USKOK. In October 2005, he was appointed Deputy Attorney General and on 2 November 2005 the acting director of USKOK, instead of Željko Žganjer who resigned in the circumstances of poor relations with the Attorney General Mladen Bajić. In late February 2014, he was mentioned as a completely new prospective candidate for the position of the Attorney General. He was appointed to that position on 7 March 2014 by the Croatian Parliament.

Legal offices
Preceded by Mladen Bajić	State Attorney General of Croatia; 24 April 2014 – 24 April 2018	Succeeded by Dražen Jelenić
