= Croatian referendum =

Croatian referendum may refer to:

- 1991 Croatian independence referendum
- 2012 Croatian European Union membership referendum
- 2013 Croatian constitutional referendum
