= Ivan Grubišić =

Croatian priest and politician (1936–2017)

Don Ivan Grubišić
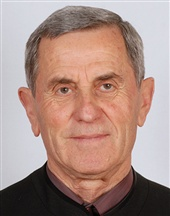

Member of Parliament
- In office 22 December 2011 – 28 December 2015
- Prime Minister: Zoran Milanović
- Constituency: X electoral district

Personal details
- Born: 20 June 1936 Dicmo, Kingdom of Yugoslavia
- Died: 19 March 2017 (aged 80) Split, Croatia
- Party: Independent
- Education: University of Zagreb; University of Zadar
- Occupation: Politician
- Profession: Priest, sociologist
- Awards: Order of Danica Hrvatska
- Worldview: Liberal

Ivan Grubišić (20 June 1936 – 19 March 2017) was a Croatian Roman Catholic priest, sociologist, and politician. He served in the Croatian Parliament from 2011 to 2015.

== Early life and education ==
Ivan Grubišić was born in Dicmo in a poor family. He had seven brothers and sisters. His father Jure and one of the brothers were killed by the Yugoslav Partisans. His mother worked as a seamstress. After finishing elementary school, Grubišić enrolled in the Catholic gymnasium in Split, graduating in 1956. During his time in high school he played the organ. Grubišić received a degree in theology in 1962 at the Catholic Faculty of Theology of the University of Zagreb, and also a degree in sociology and philosophy at the University of Zadar in 1982. He received his Ph.D. in 1995 at the Zagreb Faculty of Humanities and Social Sciences, with the thesis Religious Behavior of Catholics in Dalmatia in the Mid-80s and Evaluation of Behavior.

== Academia ==
Grubišić taught at the Catechetical Institute of the Zagreb Catholic Faculty of Theology, the Theological-Catechetical Institute in Split and the Croatian Studies College. Although officially retired since 2013, he still worked part-time at the Maritime Faculty of the University of Split, teaching philosophy.

Grubišić was the initiator and one of the founders of humanist Hrvatska akademske udruga – Čovjek nadasve (Croatian Academic Association - Man Above All). He was also the founder and the leader of the public lecture series Suvremeno društvo i duhovnost (Contemporary Society and Spirituality) and Znanost i društvo (Science and Society). He authored 12 books and edited four conference proceedings. He was also the founder and managing editor of the journal Dijalog (Dialogue). Grubišić started Savez za građansku i etičku Hrvatsku (Alliance for Civic and Ethical Croatia).

He was awarded the National Award for the Promotion and Popularization of Science, Annual Award of the City of Split, "Velimir Terzić" Award for the promotion of democracy and Slobodna Dalmacija Award for Lifetime Achievement. In 2007, President Stjepan Mesić awarded him the Order of Danica Hrvatska for special merits in culture.

== Politics ==
Despite being warned against any form of active engagement in politics by the leadership of the Catholic Church, Grubišić led an independent list in the 2011 parliamentary election in the 10th electoral district, eventually winning 29.000 votes (11.7%), and two seats in Sabor.

In January 2012, the Archbishop Marin Barišić suspended Grubišić for founding a political party, and accepting the parliamentary term. His suspension covered exercise of confession, preaching and celebrating the Holy Mass, as well as the ban on wearing the priestly garments. Grubišić appealed to the Congregation for the Clergy, but his appeal was rejected.

Grubišić actively advocated revision, even termination, of the treaties signed between Croatia and the Holy See, which would, among other things, reduce the amount of taxpayer money annually given to the Catholic Church from the state budget. He criticized Church leadership on several occasions because of their profligacy. He believed that religious communities should be financed only by their members through church tax, praising the example of Germany.

Grubišić also opposed the teaching of religious education in public schools stating that it should only be taught in churches.

During the campaign for the 2013 referendum on prohibiting same-sex marriage, Grubišić stated that "referendum was unnecessary because definition of a marriage as a union between a man and a woman already stands in the family law", as well as that referendum created a form of talibanism, or "exclusion of others and different which is in contrast with the Christs teaching".

Grubišić ran on 2013 local elections as a candidate for the Split-Dalmatia county prefect, and eventually came in second. However, he was elected to the Split City Council and served as a city councilor from 2013 until his resignation and formal departure from politics in 2016.

In 2014 interview for Index.hr, Grubišić described Cabinet of Zoran Milanović as "less prone to theft, but incapable and with no results". When commenting on President Ivo Josipović, with whom he was a good friend, he stated that it would've been tragedy if he had been elected for a second term, because "he says what people want to hear, but he didn't initiate any changes to the matters in which he had jurisdiction". Grubišić also criticized nationalism in Croatia stating that "nationalism itself shouldn't be a moral crisis, but the way it's carried out in Croatia is associated with hatred, and hatred should always be suppressed. Hate speech is not a speech of civilized society, particularly human and Christian society." In 2016, he retired from politics and thus his suspension was repealed by the Archbishop.

== Death ==
On 19 March 2017, after struggling with health problems Grubišić died in Split, aged 80. He spent his last years in the retirement home for priests in Split. He was buried in his hometown of Dicmo.
