= 2012 Croatian European Union membership referendum =

- 22 January 2012
- Are you in favour of the membership of the Republic of Croatia in the European Union?

Results
Choice	Votes	%
Yes	1,299,008	66.67%
No	649,490	33.33%
Valid votes	1,948,498	99.40%
Invalid or blank votes	11,733	0.60%
Total votes	1,960,231	100.00%
Registered voters/turnout	4,504,765	43.51%
Results by county
Yes: 55%–60% 60%–65% 65%–70%	70%–75% >75%

Croatia and the EU prior to its accession in 2013

A referendum on the EU accession of the Republic of Croatia was held on 22 January 2012. Croatia finished accession (membership) negotiations on 30 June 2011 and signed the Treaty of Accession on 9 December 2011, setting it on course to become the bloc's 28th member state. The Constitution of Croatia requires that a binding referendum be held on any political union reducing national sovereignty, such as via European Union membership. On 23 December 2011 the Croatian Parliament made a preliminary decision on EU accession and determined that the referendum would be held on 22 January 2012. The 2012 Croatian EU accession referendum was the first referendum held in Croatia since the Croatian independence referendum held more than 20 years earlier, in 1991.

The Croatian EU accession referendum campaign officially began on 3 January 2012; a yes vote was supported by both the political parties in government and the larger opposition parties in Croatia. The largest parties' joint support of EU membership existed since 2005, when the Alliance for Europe (Croatian: Savez za Europu) was set up as an informal alliance aimed at achieving membership as a strategic goal of Croatian foreign policy. Opposition to Croatian EU accession was voiced by non-parliamentary parties only. The pro-membership and informational campaign – which included television promotional videos, addresses by leading government and opposition politicians, and information booklets mailed to every household in Croatia – was announced to have cost 4.8 million kuna (c. €640,000). Opinion polling was regularly carried out by three different agencies; since May 2011, percentages supporting EU membership ranged between 55% and 63%. The Croatian State Election Committee was in charge of vote organization, ballot counting and result publication.

The EU accession referendum passed with 66.27% votes cast in support, 33.13% against the proposed joining of the EU and 0.60% invalid or blank votes; it also passed in all Croatian counties. The greatest support for the referendum was recorded in Međimurje and Brod-Posavina counties, at 75.73% and 72.61% respectively. The lowest support for EU accession was recorded in Dubrovnik-Neretva County, where 42.22% of votes were cast against the proposal. The average official turnout for the referendum was 43.51%; the highest official turnouts were recorded in the city of Zagreb and in Varaždin County at 55.13% and 53.66% respectively. The result was binding on the Croatian Parliament; as a consequence, it ratified the accession treaty on 9 March 2012. The outcome was welcomed by all political parties represented in Croatia's parliament; some right-wing politicians objected to the low turnout and what they consider a loss of independence.

== Background ==
Following the signature of its Stabilisation and Association Agreement in 2001, Croatia applied for European Union (EU) membership in 2003, the European Commission recommended making it an official candidate in early 2004, and the European Council granted candidate country status to Croatia in mid-2004. Accession negotiations, while originally set for March 2005, began in October of that year. Croatia completed the accession negotiations on 30 June 2011; on 9 December 2011 it signed the Treaty of Accession, changing its status from a candidate to an acceding country as it prepared to become the 28th EU member state. The ratification process by the Parliaments of all 27 current EU member states was expected to be concluded by the end of June 2013, and Croatia's accession to the EU was expected to take place on 1 July 2013. In addition to ratification by the current EU member states, Article 142 of the Constitution of Croatia requires that a binding referendum be held on sovereignty issues such as Croatian EU membership.

=== Voting issues ===
The Croatian Parliament tasked the Croatian State Election Committee with referendum voting organization, ballot counting, and result publication. The committee scheduled the referendum vote for 22 January 2012 starting at 07:00 and lasting until 19:00, at regular polling stations in Croatia, in Croatian military units, in Croatian diplomatic missions abroad, on Croatian-flagged vessels and in prisons: 6,750 polling stations in all. For the referendum, all polling stations were grouped in a single district. Voters traveling abroad were permitted to vote in the Croatian diplomatic missions as with Croatian presidential elections; however, the initial instructions by the Ministry of Public Administration did not allow voters within Croatia who were away from their place of residence to vote in the referendum, nor did it allow absentee ballots. GONG, the Croatian election supervision NGO, requested that the authorities correct this. One restriction was removed by 3 January, when voters were permitted to register to vote in Croatia away from their legal residence. Registration was possible until 7 January, in person, by fax, or by e-mail. When the registration process completed in early January 2012 ahead of the referendum, there were 4,504,686 voters in the voter registry (the same one used in parliamentary and presidential elections).

The State Election Committee defined the polling stations's appearance and their immediate surroundings up to 50 metres (160 feet) away, prohibiting campaigning and displaying of promotional materials there as with elections in Croatia. Unlike Croatian elections, there is no mandatory halt to campaigning before a referendum. GONG appointed approximately 300 observers to monitor the referendum voting. The Election Committee announced that it would start publishing voting results on its web site two hours after the polling stations in Croatia closed, and it would expect to determine the referendum's outcome by midnight. If a proposed question was supported by a simple majority of those voting, the proposal would be considered passed and the result binding on the Croatian Parliament pursuant to §87, paragraphs 4 and 5 of the Croatian Constitution. Since the referendum passed, the Croatian Parliament was required to ratify the Croatian EU accession treaty. Amendments (from 2010) to the constitution provide that referendums are valid regardless of actual turnout. If the referendum proposal were to have failed, it could have been repeated in six months or a year. It is estimated that a referendum rejection would have cost Croatia approximately €1.6 billion in lost EU funding until 2014.

== Date ==
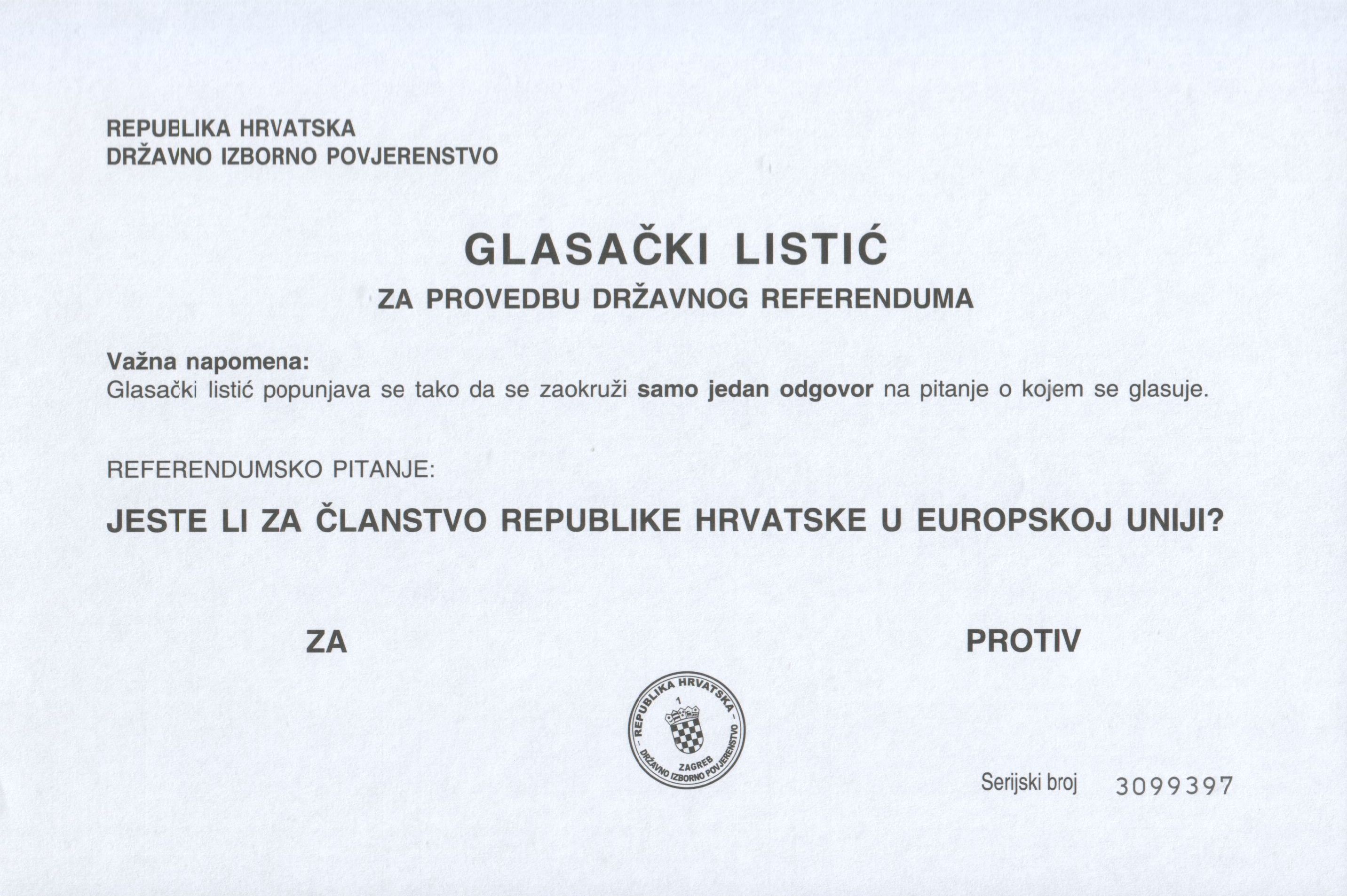
The referendum ballot question, in Croatian, was simply Jeste li za članstvo Republike Hrvatske u Europskoj uniji? meaning "Are you in favour of the membership of the Republic of Croatia in the European Union?"

In November 2010, the Croatian Parliament decided to hold the EU accession referendum 30 days after the treaty was signed; since the treaty was signed on 9 December 2011, the referendum was consequently (originally) scheduled for 9 January 2012. In November 2010, the Croatian Government proposed to hold the EU accession referendum simultaneously with another referendum aimed at altering general referendum rules.

Days after the 2011 parliamentary elections in early December 2011, it was suggested by Vesna Pusić – already recognized as the future Minister of Foreign and European Affairs – that the referendum should be postponed until March 2012 to allow better preparation for the poll. The suggestion was soon followed by a similar request made by GONG that the referendum be postponed until mid-February or later; its request was also supported by five major trade unions. GONG's request was made because of what they stated to be: poor information provided to citizens; undefined procedures for voter registration away from a voter's permanent residence; unclear directions for voting abroad; no legal provisions specifically defining the composition of ballot counting commissions; no provisions for referendum vote monitoring by partisan, non-partisan and foreign monitors; no legal provisions regarding referendum funding (since the 2011 state budget did not appropriate any funds to cover referendum expenses); no legal provisions funding the pro-referendum campaign or allowing the campaign itself; and the lack of restrictions against campaigning on the day of the referendum. The union support for this request was due to the government's ultimately not putting forward the other referendum (altering the conditions for referendums from citizens by changing the number of petitioners required and the time allowed to gather their signatures), which they had earlier agreed to do. Another request to postpone the election was made by more than a thousand signatories of a petition to the government, demanding that the referendum be postponed until after the International Criminal Tribunal for the former Yugoslavia (ICTY) returned the final verdict in the case against generals Ante Gotovina and Mladen Markač. They cited concerns over EU support for the ICTY, which they describe as biased; they therefore questioned if the EU favoured some nations over others.

On 23 December 2011, the Croatian Parliament made a preliminary decision on EU membership and determined that the EU accession referendum would be held on 22 January 2012. Furthermore, no other referendum question would be presented at that time. The preliminary accession decision was supported by 129 MPs, with the 6 Croatian Democratic Alliance of Slavonia and Baranja (HDSSB) MPs abstaining. During the debate that preceded the vote, the HDSSB MPs requested that the EU accession referendum be postponed for three to six months in order to allow a broader discussion on EU accession. Their specific concern was that Croatia might lose elements of its statehood and sovereignty, and the postponement was requested to present to the voters the effects of the Treaty of Lisbon on Croatia before the referendum was held. The parliamentary decision to hold the referendum on 22 January 2012 was supported by 124 MPs, with 6 HDSSB MPs and 6 Croatian Labourists – Labour Party MPs voting against the decision. The Labour party advocated postponing the referendum until 12 February in order to give more time to provide information on the consequences of EU membership. The referendum question was announced by the newly elected Prime Minister designate Zoran Milanović as "simple and bare": "Are you for the membership of the Republic of Croatia in the European Union?" The 2012 Croatian EU accession referendum was the first referendum held in Croatia since the Croatian independence referendum in 1991.

== Campaign ==
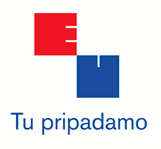
"Tu pripadamo" (We belong here): government referendum campaign logo

The Croatian EU accession referendum campaign officially started on 3 January 2012, with a declaration that it was aimed at providing to Croatian citizens clear, concise and transparent information on the EU accession negotiations and EU membership. The campaign included television promotions and addresses by leading politicians such as: the President of Croatia, Ivo Josipović; the prime minister, Zoran Milanović; the foreign minister, Vesna Pusić; other government members, such as Milanka Opačić, Radimir Čačić, Neven Mimica and Željko Jovanović; and former prime minister and opposition leader Jadranka Kosor. (All of these supported the referendum in their addresses.) A telephone information hotline was also set up, and 2.15 million EU information booklets were prepared for mailing to every household in the country. Finally, summaries of the accession treaty, negotiation documents and governmental report on the EU accession negotiations were published online, as were the original documents. It was announced that the campaign cost 4.8 million kuna (c. €640,000).

The leading parliamentary political parties in Croatia have jointly supported EU accession since 2005, when a group called the Alliance for Europe (Croatian: Savez za Europu) was set up as an informal alliance aimed at achieving EU membership as a strategic goal of Croatian foreign policy. Opposition to the referendum was voiced by the Croatian Party of Rights dr. Ante Starčević, a political party holding a single seat in the Croatian Parliament, claiming too little information provided to the voters, rather than the party being eurosceptic. Further opposition was voiced by several non-parliamentary parties. The most substantial opposition to the accession came from the Croatian Party of Rights (HSP), which demanded that the government fund its television campaign against EU membership. HSP also printed leaflets advocating rejecting EU accession. The party also organized other activities at 150 locations in the country aimed at the referendum proposal's rejection. During the 2011 parliamentary election campaign, HSP declared itself as the only party advocating rejection of Croatian EU accession; it failed to win a single seat, receiving 3% of the votes. Further opposition to the Croatian EU membership came from a group of non-parliamentary political parties organized as the Alliance for Croatia (Croatian: Savez za Hrvatsku) claiming that the move jeopardizes Croatian independence, but the alliance's December 2011 protest in Zagreb drew only 150 people.

The government's campaign was criticized as having poor promotional videos, especially lacking in informational value. The final days of the campaign were marked by events in support of and opposition to joining the EU, as the Ministry of Foreign and European Affairs set up an EU information event in Zagreb, while a protest against EU accession at the main city square drew 200 (some arrests occurred). The Croatian Bishops' Conference called on citizens to vote in the referendum, reminding Croatians that Croatia is a part of European culture while refraining from directly advocating either position. The Croatian Academy of Sciences and Arts also supported joining the EU with 93 academicians in favour, 2 against and 1 abstention; they said that the event represents a great opportunity for Croatia. In contrast to EU accession opponents' request to postpone the referendum until Generals Gotovina and Markač were released by the ICTY, Gotovina himself urged citizens of Croatia to vote in the referendum and said that he would vote in favour of joining the EU.

== Opinion polls ==
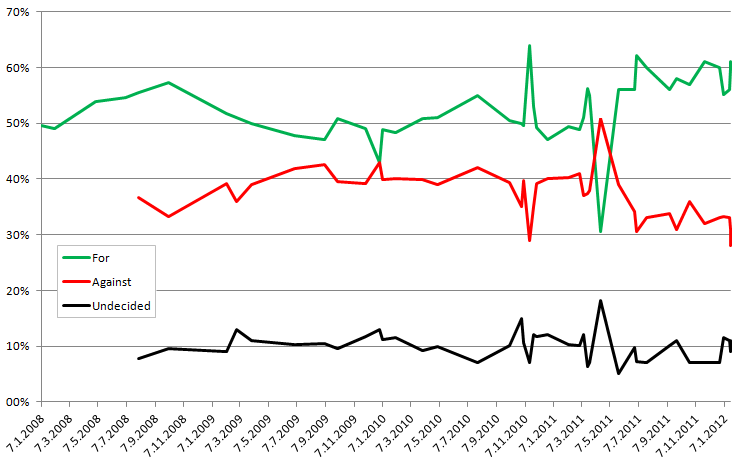
2008–2012 results of Croatian EU membership opinion polling

Opinion polling regarding Croatian EU membership was regularly carried out by the CRO Demoskop, Ipsos Puls and Mediana Fides agencies. Since 2008, these polls overall indicated support for Croatian EU membership; in May 2011 and after, support ranged between 55% and 63%. The highest support since 2008 was 64% in the first half of November 2010. The lowest level of EU membership support (between 23% and 38%) was reported on 15–16 April 2011 in the wake of the ICTY's guilty verdict for Generals Gotovina and Markač.

In early January 2012, an NGO advocating voting against the referendum called the "Council for Croatia – NO TO EU" (Croatian: Vijeće za Hrvatsku – NE U EU) reported that they had contracted a Canadian company (one unknown to the Croatian public) called the "Business Knowledge Corporation" to conduct their own poll on the issue; they stated that with 1,942 polled, 57.2% were against the referendum while 41% declined to answer the poll question. The NGO said that the apparent gross disparity between these results and the results of all other recent polls was due to government manipulation.

Poll source	Date(s) administered/published	Sample size	For/Favour	Against/Oppose	Undecided/No answer
Ipsos Puls for the MVEP	20 January 2012	840	61%	28%	11%
Ipsos Puls for Nova TV	19 January 2012	960	60%	31%	9%
Ipsos Puls	18 January 2012	1,000	56%	33%	11%
CRO Demoskop	3 and 4 January 2012	1,300	55.1%	33.3%	11.6%
Ipsos Puls for Nova TV	27 December 2011	1,000	60%	33%	7%
Ipsos Puls for Nova TV	25 November 2011	1,000	61%	32%	7%
Ipsos Puls for Nova TV	25 October 2011	1,000	57%	36%	7%
Ipsos Puls for Nova TV	26 September 2011	1,000	58%	31%	11%
CRO Demoskop	12 September 2011	1,300	56.1%	33.8%	10.1%
Ipsos Puls for Nova TV	25 July 2011	1,000	60%	33%	7%
CRO Demoskop	1 and 2 July 2011	1,300	62.2%	30.5%	7.3%
Hendal for HRT	28 June 2011	?	56%	34.2%	9.8%
Ipsos Puls for Nova TV	25 May 2011	1,000	56%	39%	5%
Ipsos Puls for Nova TV	16 April 2011*	600	38%	52%	10%
Mediana Fides for Jutarnji list	15 and 16 April 2011*	700	23%	49.8%	26.4%
Ipsos Puls for Nova TV	24 March 2011	1,000	55%	38%	7%
Mediana Fides for Jutarnji list	21 March 2011	?	56.3%	37.3%	6.4%
Ipsos Puls for Nova TV	12 March 2011	600	51%	37%	12%
CRO Demoskop	4 March 2011	1,300	48.9%	41%	10.1%
CRO Demoskop	7 February 2011	1,300	49.4%	40.3%	10.2%
Ipsos Puls for Nova TV	25 December 2010	1,000	47%	40%	12%
CRO Demoskop	30 November and 1 December 2010	1,300	49.2%	39.1%	11.7%
Ipsos Puls for Nova TV	25 November 2010	1,000	53%	35%	12%
Ipsos Puls	1–15 November 2010	1,000	64%	29%	7%
CRO Demoskop	2 and 3 November 2010	1,300	49.6%	39.8%	10.6%
Ipsos Puls for Nova TV	29 October 2010	1,000	50%	35%	15%
CRO Demoskop	4 and 5 October 2010	1,300	50.5%	39.4%	10.1%
Ipsos Puls for Nova TV	28 July 2010	1,000	55%	42%	7%
CRO Demoskop	3 and 4 May 2010	1,300	51.1%	39%	9.9%
CRO Demoskop	31 March and 1 April 2010	1,300	50.8%	39.9%	9.3%
CRO Demoskop	3 February 2010	1,300	48.4%	40.1%	11.5%
CRO Demoskop	4 and 5 January 2010	1,300	48.9%	39.9%	11.2%
Ipsos Puls for Nova TV	31 December 2009	?	43%	43%	13%
CRO Demoskop	30 November and 1 December 2009	1,300	49.1%	39.1%	11.8%
CRO Demoskop	31 September and 1 October 2009	1,300	50.9%	39.5%	9.6%
CRO Demoskop	3 September 2009	1,300	47%	42.6%	10.4%
CRO Demoskop	1 and 2 July 2009	1,300	47.8%	41.9%	10.3%
Ipsos Puls for Nova TV	31 March 2009	1,000	50%	39%	11%
Ipsos Puls for Nova TV	28 February 2009	1,000	51%	36%	13%
CRO Demoskop	5 February 2009	1,300	51.8%	39.2%	9%
CRO Demoskop	3 and 4 October 2008	1,300	57.3%	33.2%	9.5%
CRO Demoskop	31 July and 1 August 2008	1,300	55.5%	36.7%	7.8%
CRO Demoskop	4 July 2008	1,300	54.7%	N/A	N/A
CRO Demoskop	2 May 2008	1,300	53.9%	N/A	N/A
CRO Demoskop	4 February 2008	1,300	49%	N/A	N/A
CRO Demoskop	7 January 2008	1,300	49.6%	N/A	N/A
*Note: On 15 April 2011, the ICTY sentenced Ante Gotovina to 24 years in prison; Mladen Markač was sentenced to 18 years in prison. (A third defendant, Ivan Čermak, was cleared.)

== Results ==
The EU accession referendum passed with 66.27% of votes cast in support and 33.13% against EU membership for Croatia. There were 0.6% blank or invalid votes. Even though all Croatian citizens were voting in a single constituency for the referendum's purposes, the State Election Committee published the results by individual counties, cities, and municipalities. The referendum passed in all Croatian counties. The greatest support for the referendum was recorded in Međimurje and Brod-Posavina counties at 75.73% and 72.61% respectively. The lowest support for the EU accession was recorded in Dubrovnik-Neretva County, where 42.22% votes were cast against the proposal. The Croatian diaspora voted 83.13% in support. Only 18 out of 556 cities or municipalities in Croatia voted against the referendum proposal. Of those, six are in Split-Dalmatia County, four in Koprivnica-Križevci County, two in Zagreb and Dubrovnik-Neretva counties each, and a single municipality in Istria, Primorje-Gorski Kotar, Šibenik-Knin and Zadar counties each.

The average turnout at the referendum was 43.51%. The figure includes the voters living abroad, whose turnout was only 3.51%; they comprise more than 9% of the total Croatian electorate. The highest turnouts were recorded in the city of Zagreb and in Varaždin County, at 55.13% and 53.66% respectively, while the lowest turnout in Croatia was recorded in Lika-Senj County at just 34.52%. There is no turnout threshold for a referendum to be legally valid.

The low turnout was attributed in part to poor voter registry maintenance. The registry allegedly contains up to 900,000 nonexistent voters due to poor database maintenance, especially in updating the registry using death certificates and change of residence records. This allegation was supported by the 2011 census. The poor voter records were subsequently cited as the cause of the low formal turnout, which would otherwise have exceeded 50%. It was later estimated that the actual turnout in Croatia itself, without the diaspora, was 61%.

County	Electorate	Turnout	%	For	%	Against	%	Invalid	%
Bjelovar-Bilogora	113,642	51,820	45.60%	32,242	62.22%	19,299	37.24%	279	0.54%
Brod-Posavina	155,416	65,735	42.30%	47,729	72.61%	17,580	26.74%	426	0.65%
Dubrovnik-Neretva	115,996	53,708	46.30%	30,574	56.93%	22,674	42.22%	460	0.85%
Istria	199,746	98,235	49.18%	67,189	68.40%	30,363	30.91%	683	0.69%
Karlovac	133,333	61,074	45.81%	40,731	66.69%	19,904	32.59%	439	0.72%
Koprivnica-Križevci	101,050	49,904	49.39%	30,178	60.47%	19,474	39.02%	252	0.51%
Krapina-Zagorje	114,920	54,742	47.63%	34,748	63.48%	19,616	35.83%	378	0.69%
Lika-Senj	57,032	19,689	34.52%	13,912	70.66%	5,618	28.53%	159	0.81%
Međimurje	100,640	52,133	51.80%	39,479	75.73%	12,364	23.72%	290	0.55%
Osijek-Baranja	291,205	131,720	45.23%	88,980	67.55%	42,003	31.89%	737	0.56%
Požega-Slavonia	78,335	34,529	44.08%	24,218	70.14%	10,092	29.23%	219	0.63%
Primorje-Gorski Kotar	287,202	144,104	50.18%	99,156	68.81%	44,198	30.67%	750	0.52%
Sisak-Moslavina	177,950	73,952	41.56%	50,034	67.66%	23,443	31.70%	475	0.64%
Split-Dalmatia	430,299	197,783	45.96%	115,795	58.55%	80,515	40.71%	1,473	0.74%
Šibenik-Knin	122,901	45,546	37.06%	29,033	63.74%	16,150	35.46%	363	0.80%
Varaždin	153,037	82,117	53.66%	57,399	69.90%	24,259	29.54%	459	0.56%
Virovitica-Podravina	83,699	37,055	44.27%	24,253	65.45%	12,589	33.97%	213	0.58%
Vukovar-Syrmia	179,929	69,501	38.63%	47,970	69.02%	21,000	30.22%	531	0.76%
Zadar	182,680	70,458	38.57%	43,330	61.50%	26,574	37.72%	554	0.78%
Zagreb County	284,793	150,403	52.81%	97,756	65.00%	51,934	34.53%	713	0.47%
City of Zagreb	728,332	401,529	55.13%	272,246	67.80%	127,455	31.74%	1,828	0.46%
Voting abroad	412,628	14,494	3.51%	12,056	83.18%	2,386	16.46%	52	0.36%
TOTAL	4,504,765	1,960,231	43.51%	1,299,008	66.27%	649,490	33.13%	11,733	0.60%
Source: State Election Committee

== Reactions ==
=== Domestic ===
After the result's announcement, President Josipović commented that the day was of great significance to Croatia, defining the nation as one with a European future. Prime Minister Milanović welcomed the decision as historic and as the first such decision made by Croatians alone; he also said that the referendum represented a turning point for Croatia. Croatian Parliament Speaker Boris Šprem said that a new chapter of Croatian history and better fortune for the nation was dawning. The Croatian Minister of the Economy, Radimir Čačić, concluded that Croatia's credit rating would have been downgraded if the referendum had not passed. He also stated that, since the referendum passed, it was a good opportunity to upgrade the rating. Minister of Finance Slavko Linić stated that he was pleased with the result, but not with the voter turnout. He disagreed with Čačić that the credit rating could be saved by this result, since everybody had already counted on Croatian entry to the EU. Foreign and European Affairs Minister Vesna Pusić commented that the result was good news for Europe, which faced internal problems. Former Speaker Vladimir Šeks said that the low turnout was caused by external factors – the debt crisis in Europe and a loss of confidence in Croatian political parties and institutions. Luka Bebić, also a former speaker of the Parliament, added that it was good that Croats had voted to join the EU. Former Croatian foreign minister Gordan Jandroković commented that the result is especially important for the nation's youth, and former Croatian President Stjepan Mesić stated that Croatia should be competitive and use EU funds, adding that it is not enough to be happy with entering the EU. He also commented on claims that joining the EU was tantamount to entering a new Yugoslavia, saying that "only idiots think that Yugoslavia should be renewed".

On the other side, the HSP president Daniel Srb argued that the referendum was illegitimate since 71% of Croatian voters had not taken part in the referendum or had voted against the entry of Croatia into the EU, and warned that only 28% of Croatian voters had supported joining the EU. Srb also added that Croatian citizens had shown distrust of the Croatian Government. Željko Sačić, a right-wing politician, stated that the government destroyed the concept of Croatian citizens and created an impression that Croatia was unable to govern itself. Sačić stated that the government had brought Croatia into a decaying organization in an illegitimate way, adding that the referendum result was a defeat of Croatian independence and they would challenge its validity in court. By the 3 March 2012 deadline, the Constitutional Court of Croatia received 22 appeals challenging the referendum's legality; it ruled against them all.

=== International ===
Supranational bodies

- European Union: President of the European Council Herman Van Rompuy and President of the European Commission José Manuel Barroso stated that they salute the decision of Croatian voters. They stated that EU membership will bring Croatia new opportunities and contribute to its stability and prosperity.

States

- Bosnia and Herzegovina: Members of the Presidency of Bosnia and Herzegovina welcomed the results of the referendum, expressing an expectation that Croatia would be a representative of former Yugoslavia once it became a member of the EU.
- Germany: German Chancellor Angela Merkel saluted the referendum's outcome and stated that Germany anticipated the Croatian EU entry with joy.
- Ireland: Tánaiste and Minister for Foreign Affairs and Trade Eamon Gilmore congratulated the Croatian people on their passing of the referendum on EU accession.
- Montenegro: Montenegrin President Filip Vujanović congratulated the Croatian president Ivo Josipović and the Croatian Government on its "historic" decision to enter the EU.
- Serbia: Serbian President Boris Tadić congratulated the Croatian people for their decision to enter the EU. He concluded that this act was significant for Croatia's future and was moreover a positive signal for the whole region. He stated that the Croatian EU entry would make it easier for Serbia and other countries of the region to enter the EU.
- Kosovo: Minister of Foreign Affairs Enver Hoxhaj congratulated the Croatian people for a successful referendum through a note sent to the Minister of Foreign and European Affairs of Croatia, Vesna Pusić. Minister Hoxhaj said in the note that Croatia remains a model to the other Balkan states aspiring to EU membership. "The referendum of Croatia's people which represents their aspiration to become member of the European Union is a momentum and an important drive for the other Balkan countries, aiming towards the great European family".
- Slovenia: Slovene Prime Minister Borut Pahor saluted Croatia on a strategic decision of importance to Europe and the whole region. He added that EU entry is not a solution to all problems, but it makes it easier to solve them.
- United Kingdom: David Lidington of the British Foreign and Commonwealth Office stated that he saluted the decision of Croatian citizens to join the EU. He also added that he hoped he would see Croatia as an EU member in July 2013.

== Aftermath ==
Pursuant to the referendum's outcome, the Croatian parliament ratified the accession treaty unanimously (with 136 votes in favour) on 9 March 2012.

Croatia joined EU on 1 July 2013.

== See also ==
- Enlargement of the European Union
