= Darinko Kosor =

Croatian politician

Darinko Kosor (born 14 March 1965) is a Croatian politician and a former leader of the Croatian Social Liberal Party (HSLS) from November 2009 to November 2019. He is a cousin of former Croatian prime minister Jadranka Kosor. Darinko Kosor was a president of League of Socialist Youth Zagreb.
