= Mladen Bajić =

Croatian lawyer

Attorney General of Croatia
- In office 8 May 2002 – 23 April 2014
- Prime Minister: Ivica Račan; Ivo Sanader; Jadranka Kosor; Zoran Milanović
- Preceded by: Radovan Ortynski
- Succeeded by: Dinko Cvitan

Personal details
- Born: 28 December 1950 (age 75) Split, PR Croatia, FPR Yugoslavia (modern Croatia)
- Education: Split Faculty of Law
- Occupation: Lawyer

Mladen Bajić (born 28 December 1950 in Split) is the former Attorney General of Croatia (Croatian: Glavni državni odvjetnik) of the Republic of Croatia.

Bajić graduated from the Faculty of Law in Split in 1975. After graduating, he worked at the District Attorney's offices in Dubrovnik and Split. He became the Deputy District Attorney in Split in 1987, advancing to District Attorney in 2001.

Bajić was named the State Attorney General in 2002, succeeding Radovan Ortynski. He was reelected twice, in 2006 and 2010, and was succeeded by Dinko Cvitan in 2014.

== Sources ==
- Životopis Mladena Bajića (in Croatian)
- Mladen Bajić - Odvjetnik koji je pomaknuo civilizacijske zidove (in Croatian)
- Prisegnuo novi glavni državni: Bajić: Sposobni smo od Haaškog suda preuzeti progon ratnih zločina (in Croatian)

Legal offices
Preceded by Radovan Ortynski	State Attorney General of Croatia; 8 May 2002 – 23 April 2014	Succeeded by Dinko Cvitan
