= Zlata Hrvoj Šipek =

Zlata Hrvoj Šipek (born 1956, Karlovac) is a Croatian lawyer, former Attorney General of Croatia and the first woman to hold that position. Hrvoj Šipek was a part of controversies related to Josipa Rimac, State's Attorney Office officials Dražen Jelenić and Vanja Marušić.

== Biography ==
Born in 1956 in Karlovac. In 1978, she graduated from the Faculty of Law at the University of Zagreb. In 1980, she passed the qualification exam for lawyers. Since then, she has been working in the prosecutor's office.

Since 2001, she has worked as a Deputy Prosecutor General. From 2005 to April 2018, she headed the Civil Law Department of the Croatian Prosecutor's Office, and with the election of Dražen Jelenić as Prosecutor General in 2018, she became his First Deputy. Since February 2020, after Dražen Jelenić turned out to be a member of the Masonic Lodge and was removed from the office, she has been temporarily acting as the Prosecutor General. Two years later Jelenić was back in State's Attorney Office.

She was appointed on May 18 in a vote in the Croatian parliament (80 votes in favor and 40 against). Lawmakers chose her on a competitive basis among six candidates who applied for the position. On May 26, she took the oath of office as Prosecutor General in front of Speaker of the Croatian Parliament Gordan Jandroković. In September 2023 she stated that she will not apply for re-election.
