= Office for the Suppression of Corruption and Organised Crime =

Croatian anti-corruption organization

Office for the Suppression of Corruption and Organised Crime Ured za suzbijanje korupcije i organiziranog kriminaliteta
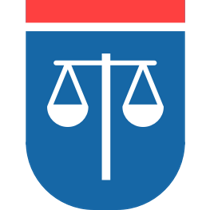
- Official seal

Office overview
- Formed: 3 December 2001; 24 years ago
- Type: Special body of State's Attorney Office specialized in fighting corruption and organized crime
- Jurisdiction: Croatia
- Headquarters: Branimirova 4 Zagreb, Croatia
- Website: uskok.hr

Office executive
- Currently: Sven Mišković since 1 January 2026

The Office for the Suppression of Corruption and Organised Crime (Croatian: Ured za suzbijanje korupcije i organiziranog kriminaliteta), better known as USKOK, is a specialized agency within the Croatian State's Attorney Office focused on investigations related to corruption and organized crime in Croatia.

USKOK was formed in December 2001 and its headquarters are located in Zagreb. The bureau's name is a bacronym from uskok, a term used for a type of Croatian militia men, who fought with guerilla tactics against the Ottoman Empire in the early 16th and 17th centuries.

Since 2009, USKOK has a counterpart in the Criminal Police Directorate (governing the Croatian Police) which maintains the National Police USKOK (Croatian: Policijski nacionalni USKOK), as well as in the judiciary – the Court Departments for Criminal Cases in the Jurisdiction of USKOK (Croatian: Sudski odjeli za postupanje u predmetima kaznenih djela iz nadležnosti USKOK-a). Described as "one of the world's most formidable anti-corruption outfits", the agency has prosecuted 2,000 individuals and achieved a 95% conviction rate in 2012, including former Prime Minister Ivo Sanader.

In its 2014 EU Anti-Corruption report, the European Commission commended USKOK's ability to execute impartial investigations but later noted in 2017 enduring problems concerning its political neutrality and independence from the Croatian government.
