= Laku noć, Hrvatska =

- Laku noć, Hrvatska logo
- Genre: Animation
- Created by: Željko Zima
- Country of origin: Croatia
- Original language: Croatian

Production
- Executive producer: Biserka Mihalić
- Running time: 10 minutes 25 minutes (on weekends)
- Production company: Croatia Film

Original release
- Network: Nova TV (2005); Jabuka TV (2006-2008)
- Release: 8 February 2005 – 7 January 2008

Laku noć, Hrvatska (Good night, Croatia) is a Croatian adult animated series produced by Croatia Film of Zagreb. It debuted in February 2005 on Nova TV and was shown on the station daily until the end of the year. In 2006, it showed up on Jabuka TV. The entire series is also available on 4 DVDs.

Laku noć, Hrvatska is a parody of Croatian TV news and other TV shows. Every episode has three basic parts: news, sport and weather. It satirically makes fun of Croatian and other world politicians. It also features animated commercials during the course of an episode.

There were 252 episodes of the show. On weekdays episodes were 10 minutes long, while those shown on weekends were 25 minutes long.

== Voice actors ==
- Dalibor Talajić as Aleksandar Stanković, Josip Radeljak, Dragan Primorac, Ivica Kirin, Hloverka Novak-Sržić, Andrija Hebrang, Vladimir Šeks, Josip Bozanić, Doris Košta, Krešimir Mišak, Neven Ljubičić, Ljubo Ćesić Rojs, George Walker Bush, Joško Martinović, Marko Perković Thompson, Severina Kojić (dialogue, season 1 and 2), Niko Kranjčar (dialogue), Zlatko Kranjčar, Mislav Bago, Goran Bare, Ivan Šuker, Slaven Letica, Mirko Fodor, Dražen Budiša, Goran Višnjić, Boris Dvornik, Bruno Kovačević, Marko Grubnić, Ante Gotovina, Goran Ivanišević, Hari Rončević, Damir Kajin, Branko Vukelić, Milorad Pupovac (singing voice), Željko Pervan, Osama bin Laden, Radovan Karadžić, Zlatko Vitez, Damir Polančec, Barack Obama, Slobodan Prosperov Novak, Vladimir Putin, Tomislav Ladan, Elvis, Hrvoje Horvat, Nadan Vidošević, Pope Paul VI, Danijela Martinović (speaking voice), Tereza Kesovija, Drago Plečko, Žana Lelas, Jelena Brajša, Dubravka Ostojić, Hrvoje Hribar, Vladimir Zagorec, Muhammed Ali, Boris Novković, Bojana Gregorić, Ivan Blažičko and others
- Duško Modrinić as Denis Latin, Ivo Sanader, Ivica Račan, Neven Ciganović, Zdravko Mamić, Petar Čobanković, Slavko Linić, Siniša Svilan, Zoran Vakula, Zoran Milanović, Berislav Rončević, Tony Blair, Igor Štimac, Denis Kuljiš, Božidar Kalmeta, Tomislav Karamarko, Gordan Jandroković, Božo Biškupić, Mišo Kovač, Oliver Mlakar, Stipe Petrina, Zlatko Sudac, Vladimir Drobnjak, Željko Kerum, Ivan Gudelj, Damir Bajs, Boris Mikšić (dialogue), Milorad Pupovac (dialogue), Vlado Gotovac, Tonči Huljić, Mladen Stubljar, Luka Bebić, Silvio Berlusconi, Mladen Grdović, Mato Arlović, Mirko Galić, Petar Vlahov, Mario Salvador, Tiho Orlić, Julius Caesar, Joško Vlašić, Karl Marx, Filip Medić, Janica Kostelić and others
- Jerko Marčić as Goran Milić, Miroslav Ćiro Blažević, Božo Sušec, Milan Bandić (dialogue), Marina Matulović-Dropulić, Carla del Ponte (dialogue), Ivan Zvonimir Čičak, Duško Ljuština, Vlatka Pokos (dialogue), Winston Churchill, Gandhi, Miroslav Škoro, Jacques Houdek, Siniša Vuco, Dinko Bogdanić, Veljko Bulajić, Zoran Krivić, Vedran Benić, Slobodan Milošević, Marino Strmo, Dubravka Šuica, Vedran Ćorluka, Marijan Mlinarić, Dragutin Tadijanović, Marijan Ban and others
- Marija Borić as Jadranka Kosor, Pamela Anderson, Renata Sopek, Mirjana Hrga, Ksenija Marinković and others
- Luka Juričić as Flying Reporter, Mićo Dušanović, Kolinda Grabar-Kitarović, Đurđa Adlešič, Vedrana Rudan, Dijana Čuljak, Zlatko Kramarić, Sanja Doležal, Blanka Vlašić, Ingrid Antičević-Marinović, Elizabeta Gojan, Hillary Clinton and others
- Vladimir Šagadin as Anto Đapić, Miljenko Jergović, Silvija Luks and others
- Joško Ševo as Stipe Mesić, Josip Broz Tito and others
- Nina Kaić as additional voices
- Ana Maras as Severina Kojić (season 3)
- Jelena Martinović as Mila Elegović

== Notable music parodies ==
Laku noć, Hrvatska was also popular in Croatian media for numerous parodies criticising politics and pop culture through various songs. This list is composed of the most acclaimed parodies, alongside the people who were included in the renditions.

Song name	Performed by a parody version of	Parody of	Originally by
"Luzer"	(Croatia) Zoran Milanović	"I'm a Loser"	(United Kingdom) The Beatles
"Stranac u noći"	(Croatia) Zoran Milanović	"Stranci u noći"	(Croatia) Ivo Robić
"Barbie Boy"	(Croatia) Neven Ciganović & (Croatia) Dino Rađa	"Barbie Girl"	(Denmark) Aqua
"Kad letim ja"	(Croatia) Gordan Jandroković	"Fly Robin Fly"	(Germany) Silver Convention
"Jubito"	(Croatia) Ivica Kirin	"YMCA"	(United States) Village People
"Prekrasan sam"	(Croatia) Aleksandar Stanković	"Suspicious Minds"	(United States) Elvis Presley
"Munje rokenrol"	(Croatia) Ivo Sanader & (Croatia) Stipe Mesić	"Greased Lightning"	(United States) John Travolta
"Mupovac"	(Croatia) Milorad Pupovac	"Muppet Show Theme"	(United States) The Muppet Show
"Super truper"	(Croatia) Marko Perković Thompson	"Take a Chance on Me"	(Sweden) ABBA
"Modri mačak"	(Croatia) Marko Grubnić	"Zašto baš ti"	(Bosnia and Herzegovina) Mile Kitić
"Karla i Ante"	(Switzerland) Carla del Ponte & (Croatia) Ante Gotovina	"Time to Say Goodbye"	(United Kingdom) Sarah Brightman & (Italy) Andrea Bocelli
"Kad dileme ne bude"	(Croatia) Ivica Račan	"Te noći kad umrem"	(Bosnia and Herzegovina) Bijelo Dugme
"Dr. Dabić"	(Serbia) Radovan Karadžić	"Goodbye My Love, Goodbye"	(Greece) Demis Roussos
"I Vanju Šević"	(Croatia) Goran Ivanišević	"Oprosti mi pape"	(Croatia) Oliver Dragojević

== Controversy ==
During a 2005 interview for the weekly paper Nacional, one of the show's creators, Števo Šinik (more prominently known as Stiv Cinik) accused the director of Croatia Film, Željko Zima, of censorship and hindering the original vision of the project. He alleged Zima took control over development removing portions of the script and attempting to discourage certain practices to prevent or downplay criticism towards members of the government.
