= List of members of the Sabor, 2008–2011 =

The sixth Sabor was constituted on 11 January 2008. It came into existence following the November 2007 general election and consisted of 153 representatives elected from 10 geographical and two special electoral districts. It was dissolved on 28 October 2011, about a month before the 2011 general election.

== Electoral system in Croatia ==
The 10 electoral districts, with the two non-geographical ones

Since 1999 Croatia has been divided into 10 geographically based electoral districts. These districts are named using Roman numerals and were formed according to the number of voters so that each district holds around 250,000–300,000 registered voters. These districts therefore do not correspond to the borders of top administrative divisions within Croatia and each district contains one or more or parts of several Croatian counties.

Each district sends 14 MPs to the parliament and winning candidates are determined using the party-list proportional representation voting system. This means that parties make lists of 14 candidates to be elected, and seats get allocated to each party in proportion to the number of votes the party receives, with the election threshold set at 5 percent of votes in each district, calculated using the standard D'Hondt formula.

In addition, there are two non-geographical districts. In District XI, up to 12 members are chosen by proportional representation - depending on the number of voters in Croatia - to represent Croatian citizens residing abroad (this district is commonly referred to as the diaspora electorate). Although all people living outside Croatia are eligible to vote for this list, the majority of voters who turnout for this list traditionally consists of Croats of Bosnia and Herzegovina, the majority of whom hold dual Croatian and Bosnian citizenships. In District XII an additional 8 members are elected to represent the 22 ethnic minorities in Croatia which are legally recognized as such in the Croatian Constitution, with 3 of these seats reserved for the Serbian minority.

Since the seats are allocated according to the proportion of votes received in each district, parties usually nominate senior party officials on top of their lists in districts where they have traditionally enjoyed good levels of support, to ensure that the party's most prominent members win parliamentary seats. All candidates are elected to four-year terms. However, many MPs who are members of post-election ruling coalitions often get appointed to various ministerial and government positions while others serve as city mayors or directors of various government agencies. In such cases they are required by law to put their parliamentary mandate on hiatus for the duration of their other term in office and their seats are then taken by party-appointed deputy MPs.

== 2007 election results ==
According to the November 2007 election results, 122 out of 153 (or almost 80 percent) of seats were won by the two major parties, the centre-right HDZ and the centre-left SDP. HDZ then entered a post-election coalition agreement with several minor parties and formed a coalition government. The 153 parliament seats were divided as follows (members of the ruling coalition indicated in bold):

- **Croatian Democratic Union** (HDZ) – 66 seats
- Social Democratic Party of Croatia (SDP) – 56 seats
- Croatian People's Party – Liberal Democrats (HNS) – 7 seats
- **Croatian Peasant Party** (HSS) – 6 seats
- Croatian Democratic Assembly of Slavonia and Baranja (HDSSB) – 3 seats
- **Independent Democratic Serb Party** (SDSS) – 3 seats
- Istrian Democratic Assembly (IDS) – 3 seats
- **Croatian Social Liberal Party** (HSLS) – 2 seats
- **Party of Democratic Action of Croatia** (SDAH) – 1 seat
- **Croatian Party of Pensioners** (HSU) – 1 seat
- Croatian Party of Rights (HSP) – 1 seat
- **Independent** – 4 seats

(Members of HDZ, HSS, SDSS and HSLS were appointed to ministerial positions in the Cabinet of Ivo Sanader II, while 5 representatives of ethnic minorities (four independents and one from ASH) and the single MP representing HSU signed a voting agreement with the ruling coalition. This gave the ruling coalition an 83-member majority in the 153-seat parliament.)

== Parliament officials ==
The president of the parliament (often also called the speaker in English) is Luka Bebić (HDZ). Vicepresidents of the parliament are:

- Vladimir Šeks (HDZ)
- Ivan Jarnjak (HDZ)
- Josip Friščić (HSS)
- Željka Antunović (SDP)
- Neven Mimica (SDP)

The secretary is Josip Sesar.

== Composition of the 6th Sabor ==
Members of HDZ, HSS, SDSS and HSLS were appointed to ministerial positions in the Cabinet of Ivo Sanader II, while 5 representatives of ethnic minorities (four independents and one from SDA) and the single MP representing HSU signed a voting agreement with the ruling coalition. This gave the ruling coalition an 83-member majority in the 153-seat parliament.

Luka Bebić (HDZ) was appointed Speaker of Parliament in the 6th assembly, replacing Vladimir Šeks (HDZ) who had held the post since December 2003.

Party		January 2008	October 2011
•	Croatian Democratic Union (HDZ)	66	65
	Social Democratic Party of Croatia (SDP)	56	53
	Croatian People's Party (HNS)	7	5
•	Croatian Peasant Party (HSS)	6	6
	Croatian Democratic Alliance of Slavonia and Baranja (HDSSB)	3	4
•	Independent Democratic Serb Party (SDSS)	3	3
	Istrian Democratic Assembly (IDS)	3	3
•	Croatian Social Liberal Party (HSLS)	2	0
•	Croatian Party of Pensioners (HSU)	1	1
	Croatian Party of Rights (HSP)	1	1
•	Party of Democratic Action of Croatia (SDA)	1	1
	Croatian Labourists – Labour Party (HL)	0	1
	Croatian Social Democrats (HSD)	0	1
	Independents	4	9

Government coalition parties denoted with bullets (•)

== MPs by party ==
This is a list of MPs elected to Sabor in the 2007 general election, sorted by party. Note that this table is a record of the 2007 election results, it is not a record of the current status of Sabor. The Changes table below records all changes in party affiliation.

Party	Name	Constituency
Croatian Democratic Union (66)	Ivo Andrić-Lužanski	District 11 (diaspora)
Croatian Democratic Union (66)	Branko Bačić	District 10
Croatian Democratic Union (66)	Ivan Bagarić	District 11 (diaspora)
Croatian Democratic Union (66)	Mladen Barišić	District 1
Croatian Democratic Union (66)	Luka Bebić	District 10
Croatian Democratic Union (66)	Božo Biškupić	District 3
Croatian Democratic Union (66)	Suzana Bilić-Vardić	District 5
Croatian Democratic Union (66)	Mato Bilonjić	District 5
Croatian Democratic Union (66)	Rade Bošnjak	District 11 (diaspora)
Croatian Democratic Union (66)	Dražen Bošnjaković	District 6
Croatian Democratic Union (66)	Ivica Buconjić	District 4
Croatian Democratic Union (66)	Perica Bukić	District 9
Croatian Democratic Union (66)	Gari Cappelli	District 8
Croatian Democratic Union (66)	Lino Červar	District 8
Croatian Democratic Union (66)	Petar Čobanković	District 5
Croatian Democratic Union (66)	Tomislav Čuljak	District 5
Croatian Democratic Union (66)	Josip Đakić	District 4
Croatian Democratic Union (66)	Stjepan Fiolić	District 6
Croatian Democratic Union (66)	Božo Galić	District 5
Croatian Democratic Union (66)	Sunčana Glavak	District 3
Croatian Democratic Union (66)	Ivo Grbić	District 9
Croatian Democratic Union (66)	Andrija Hebrang	District 2
Croatian Democratic Union (66)	Bojan Hlača	District 8
Croatian Democratic Union (66)	Davor Huška	District 5
Croatian Democratic Union (66)	Tomislav Ivić	District 4
Croatian Democratic Union (66)	Vladimir Ivković	District 3
Croatian Democratic Union (66)	Ivan Jarnjak	District 3
Croatian Democratic Union (66)	Gordan Jandroković	District 2
Croatian Democratic Union (66)	Božidar Kalmeta	District 9
Croatian Democratic Union (66)	Nedjeljka Klarić	District 9
Croatian Democratic Union (66)	Jadranka Kosor	District 1
Croatian Democratic Union (66)	Dragan Kovačević	District 4
Croatian Democratic Union (66)	Ante Kulušić	District 9
Croatian Democratic Union (66)	Boris Kunst	District 6
Croatian Democratic Union (66)	Ana Lovrin	District 9
Croatian Democratic Union (66)	Franjo Lucić	District 5
Croatian Democratic Union (66)	Anton Mance	District 7
Croatian Democratic Union (66)	Krunoslav Markovinović	District 7
Croatian Democratic Union (66)	Bianca Matković	District 2
Croatian Democratic Union (66)	Marina Matulović-Dropulić	District 7
Croatian Democratic Union (66)	Frano Matušić	District 10
Croatian Democratic Union (66)	Darko Milinović	District 9
Croatian Democratic Union (66)	Petar Mlinarić	District 5
Croatian Democratic Union (66)	Živko Nenadić	District 10
Croatian Democratic Union (66)	Marija Pejčinović-Burić	District 6
Croatian Democratic Union (66)	Damir Polančec	District 2
Croatian Democratic Union (66)	Dragan Primorac	District 11 (diaspora)
Croatian Democratic Union (66)	Zvonimir Puljić	District 10
Croatian Democratic Union (66)	Niko Rebić	District 9
Croatian Democratic Union (66)	Jerko Rošin	District 10
Croatian Democratic Union (66)	Ante Sanader	District 9
Croatian Democratic Union (66)	Ivo Sanader	District 10
Croatian Democratic Union (66)	Ivan Šantek	District 6
Croatian Democratic Union (66)	Vladimir Šeks	District 4
Croatian Democratic Union (66)	Petar Selem	District 1
Croatian Democratic Union (66)	Damir Sesvečan	District 2
Croatian Democratic Union (66)	Miroslav Škoro	District 4
Croatian Democratic Union (66)	Dubravka Šuica	District 10
Croatian Democratic Union (66)	Ivan Šuker	District 6
Croatian Democratic Union (66)	Emil Tomljanović	District 9
Croatian Democratic Union (66)	Marko Turić	District 1
Croatian Democratic Union (66)	Željko Turk	District 1
Croatian Democratic Union (66)	Ivan Vučić	District 7
Croatian Democratic Union (66)	Branko Vukelić	District 7
Croatian Democratic Union (66)	Dragan Vukić	District 11 (diaspora)
Croatian Democratic Union (66)	Mario Zubović	District 7
Social Democratic Party (56)	Ingrid Antičević-Marinović	District 9
Social Democratic Party (56)	Željka Antunović	District 10
Social Democratic Party (56)	Milan Bandić	District 2
Social Democratic Party (56)	Arsen Bauk	District 10
Social Democratic Party (56)	Dragutin Bodakoš	District 4
Social Democratic Party (56)	Biljana Borzan	District 4
Social Democratic Party (56)	Nada Čavlović-Smiljanec	District 4
Social Democratic Party (56)	Brankica Crljenko	District 9
Social Democratic Party (56)	Luka Denona	District 8
Social Democratic Party (56)	Igor Dragovan	District 5
Social Democratic Party (56)	Mirjana Ferić-Vac	District 1
Social Democratic Party (56)	Gvozden Flego	District 1
Social Democratic Party (56)	Zdenko Franić	District 7
Social Democratic Party (56)	Branko Grčić	District 10
Social Democratic Party (56)	Mario Habek	District 3
Social Democratic Party (56)	Ivan Hanžek	District 3
Social Democratic Party (56)	Goran Heffer	District 5
Social Democratic Party (56)	Mirela Holy	District 1
Social Democratic Party (56)	Nadica Jelaš	District 3
Social Democratic Party (56)	Ivo Jelušić	District 7
Social Democratic Party (56)	Ivo Josipović	District 1
Social Democratic Party (56)	Željko Jovanović	District 8
Social Democratic Party (56)	Ljubo Jurčić	District 3
Social Democratic Party (56)	Marin Jurjević	District 10
Social Democratic Party (56)	Zlatko Komadina	District 8
Social Democratic Party (56)	Ante Kotromanović	District 9
Social Democratic Party (56)	Dino Kozlevac	District 8
Social Democratic Party (56)	Josip Leko	District 7
Social Democratic Party (56)	Slavko Linić	District 8
Social Democratic Party (56)	Marina Lovrić	District 6
Social Democratic Party (56)	Šime Lučin	District 6
Social Democratic Party (56)	Marija Lugarić	District 2
Social Democratic Party (56)	Gordan Maras	District 1
Social Democratic Party (56)	Zoran Milanović	District 1
Social Democratic Party (56)	Neven Mimica	District 1
Social Democratic Party (56)	Mirando Mrsić	District 6
Social Democratic Party (56)	Zvonimir Mršić	District 2
Social Democratic Party (56)	Milanka Opačić	District 7
Social Democratic Party (56)	Rajko Ostojić	District 6
Social Democratic Party (56)	Ranko Ostojić	District 9
Social Democratic Party (56)	Ivica Pančić	District 2
Social Democratic Party (56)	Tonino Picula	District 6
Social Democratic Party (56)	Vlatko Podnar	District 4
Social Democratic Party (56)	Zdravko Ronko	District 5
Social Democratic Party (56)	Tatjana Šimac-Bonačić	District 10
Social Democratic Party (56)	Sonja Šimunović	District 5
Social Democratic Party (56)	Vesna Škulić	District 2
Social Democratic Party (56)	Gordana Sobol	District 8
Social Democratic Party (56)	Boris Šprem	District 2
Social Democratic Party (56)	Nenad Stazić	District 7
Social Democratic Party (56)	Davorko Vidović	District 6
Social Democratic Party (56)	Zoran Vinković	District 4
Social Democratic Party (56)	Biserka Vranić	District 7
Social Democratic Party (56)	Tanja Vrbat	District 8
Social Democratic Party (56)	Antun Vujić	District 1
Social Democratic Party (56)	Dragica Zgrebec	District 3
Croatian People's Party (7)	Goran Beus-Richembergh	District 6
Croatian People's Party (7)	Radimir Čačić	District 3
Croatian People's Party (7)	Miljenko Dorić	District 7
Croatian People's Party (7)	Danica Hursa	District 3
Croatian People's Party (7)	Zlatko Koračević	District 3
Croatian People's Party (7)	Dragutin Lesar	District 3
Croatian People's Party (7)	Vesna Pusić	District 1
Croatian Peasant Party (6)	Damir Bajs	District 2
Croatian Peasant Party (6)	Josip Friščić	District 2
Croatian Peasant Party (6)	Stipo Gabrić	District 10
Croatian Peasant Party (6)	Zdravko Kelić	District 5
Croatian Peasant Party (6)	Božidar Pankretić	District 7
Croatian Peasant Party (6)	Marijana Petir	District 6
Croatian Democratic Alliance of Slavonia and Baranja (3)	Branimir Glavaš	District 4
Croatian Democratic Alliance of Slavonia and Baranja (3)	Boro Grubišić	District 5
Croatian Democratic Alliance of Slavonia and Baranja (3)	Vladimir Šišljagić	District 4
Istrian Democratic Assembly (3)	Ivan Jakovčić	District 8
Istrian Democratic Assembly (3)	Damir Kajin	District 8
Istrian Democratic Assembly (3)	Boris Miletić	District 8
Independent Democratic Serb Party (3)	Ratko Gajica	District 12 (minority list)
Independent Democratic Serb Party (3)	Milorad Pupovac	District 12 (minority list)
Independent Democratic Serb Party (3)	Vojislav Stanimirović	District 12 (minority list)
Croatian Social Liberal Party (2)	Đurđa Adlešič	District 2
Croatian Social Liberal Party (2)	Ivan Čehok	District 3
Croatian Party of Pensioners (1)	Silvano Hrelja	District 8
Croatian Party of Rights (1)	Anto Đapić	District 4
Party of Democratic Action of Croatia (1)	Šemso Tanković	District 12 (minority list)
Independents (4)	Zdenka Čuhnil	District 12 (minority list)
Independents (4)	Nazif Memedi	District 12 (minority list)
Independents (4)	Furio Radin	District 12 (minority list)
Independents (4)	Deneš Šoja	District 12 (minority list)

== Changes ==
Note that a number of MPs who are high-ranking members of parties in the ruling coalition were subsequently appointed to various ministerial and governmental positions, while others continued to serve as city mayors. In such cases they are required by Croatian law to put their parliamentary mandate on hiatus for the duration of their other term of office and in the meantime their seats are then taken by a party-appointed replacement MP. Those replacements are not documented here.

Date	Constituency	Loss	Gain	Note
10 April 2008	District 3	HNS-LD	Independent	Dragutin Lesar (HNS) resigns from the Croatian People's Party – Liberal Democrats, reducing them to six seats.
24 April 2009	District 3	HNS-LD	Independent	Zlatko Horvat (HNS), who since January 2008 held the seat of Radimir Čačić, county prefect of Varaždin County, is expelled from the Croatian People's Party for entering the May 2009 local elections in the city of Varaždin as an independent. This reduced HNS to five seats.
11 January 2010	District 2	SDP	Independent	Ivica Pančić (SDP) resigns from the Social Democratic Party, reducing them to 55 seats.
12 April 2010	District 3	Independent	HL	Dragutin Lesar (Ind.) establishes the centre-left Croatian Labourists (HL) and becomes their only member of parliament.
14 July 2010	District 3	HSLS	Independent	Ivan Čehok (HSLS) resigns from the Croatian Social Liberal Party following the party's exit from the ruling coalition, reducing them to a single seat.
22 September 2010	District 2	Independent	HSD	Ivica Pančić (Ind.) joins the non-parliamentary centre-left party Croatian Social Democrats (HSD), becoming their only member of parliament.
19 October 2010	District 4	SDP	Independent	Zoran Vinković (SDP) resigns from the Social Democratic Party of Croatia, reducing them to 54 seats.
21 October 2010	District 2	HSLS	Independent	Đurđa Adlešič (HSLS) returns to parliament after stepping down from the post of deputy prime minister in the Cabinet of Jadranka Kosor following Croatian Social Liberal Party's decision to leave the ruling coalition in July 2010. She takes the seat as an independent, having resigned from the party in the meantime, leaving HSLS with no representation in parliament.
22 October 2010	District 10	HDZ	Independent	Former prime minister Ivo Sanader (HDZ) returns to parliament, having resigned from the post in July 2009 and after being expelled from the Croatian Democratic Union in January 2010. He takes the seat as an independent, reducing Croatian Democratic Union to 65 seats.
12 April 2011	District 4	Independent	HDSSB	Zoran Vinković (Ind.) joins the right-wing regionalist Croatian Democratic Alliance of Slavonia and Baranja (HDSSB) as their fourth member of parliament.
May 2011	District 3	SDP	Independent	Ljubo Jurčić (SDP) resigns from the Social Democratic Party, reducing them to 53 seats.
