= Cabinet of Jadranka Kosor =

Croatian government (2009–2011)

Kosor Cabinet
- 11th Cabinet of the Republic of Croatia

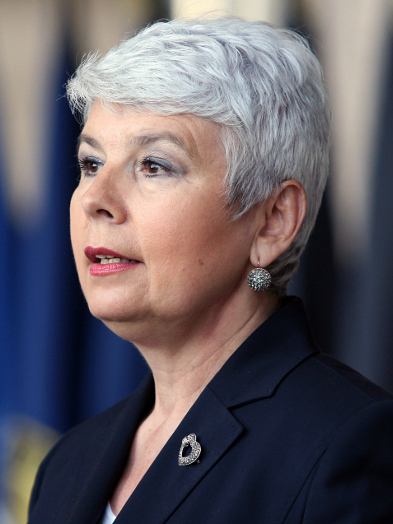
- Date formed: 6 July 2009
- Date dissolved: 23 December 2011

People and organisations
- Head of state: Stjepan Mesić (2009–2010); Ivo Josipović (2010–2011)
- Head of government: Jadranka Kosor
- Deputy head of government: Damir Polančec (2009); Đurđa Adlešić (2009–2010); Slobodan Uzelac; Božidar Pankretić (2009–2011); Ivan Šuker (2009–2010); Darko Milinović (2009–2011); Gordan Jandroković (2010–2011); Petar Čobanković (2010–2011); Domagoj Ivan Milošević (2010–2011)
- No. of ministers: 19 (on 23 December 2011)
- Ministers removed: 8
- Total no. of members: 27 (including former members)
- Member parties: Croatian Democratic Union; Croatian Peasant Party; Croatian Social Liberal Party; Independent Democratic Serb Party
- Status in legislature: Minority coalition government
- Opposition party: Social Democratic Party
- Opposition leader: Zoran Milanović

History
- Legislature terms: 2008–2011
- Predecessor: Cabinet of Ivo Sanader II
- Successor: Cabinet of Zoran Milanović

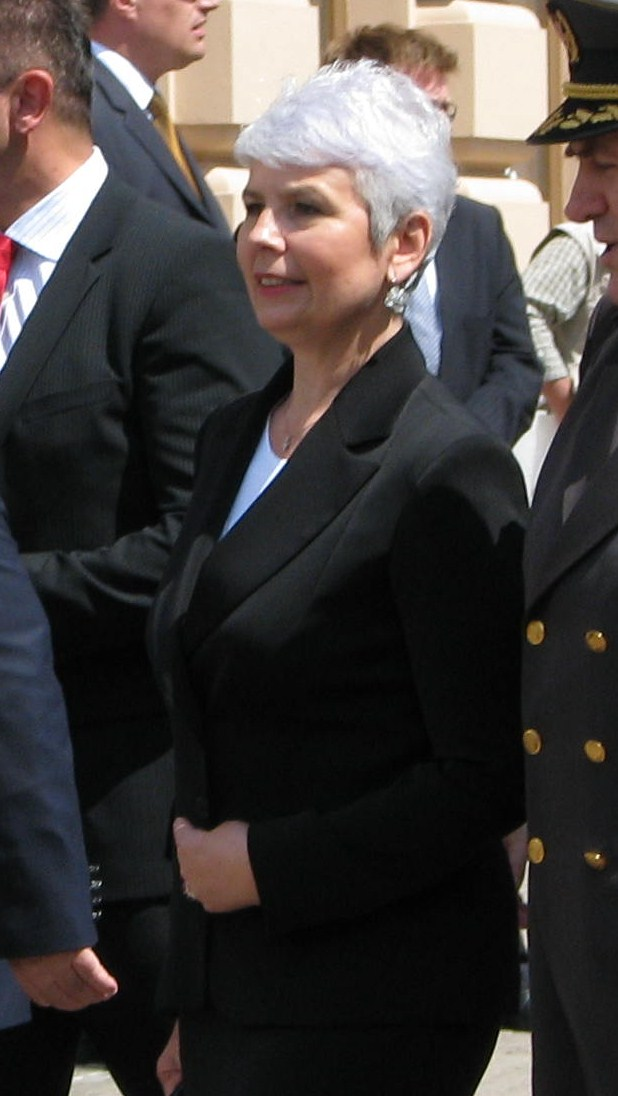
Prime Minister Jadranka Kosor

The Eleventh Government of the Republic of Croatia (Croatian: Jedanaesta Vlada Republike Hrvatske) was the Croatian Government cabinet led by Prime Minister Jadranka Kosor. It was announced on 6 July 2009 and its term ended on 23 December 2011. The cabinet came into existence after Prime Minister Ivo Sanader abruptly resigned on 1 July 2009, designating Kosor as his successor and making her the first woman to serve as prime minister since Croatia gained independence in 1991. It was succeeded by the Cabinet of Zoran Milanović following the centre-left Kukuriku coalition's success in the 2011 parliamentary elections.

The cabinet represented parties from the ruling coalition formed following the 2007 parliamentary elections:

- Croatian Democratic Union (HDZ)
- Croatian Social Liberal Party (HSLS)
- Independent Democratic Serb Party (SDSS)
- Croatian Peasant Party (HSS)

== Motions of confidence ==
Vote on the confirmation of the 11th Government of the Republic of Croatia
Ballot	6 July 2009	
Absentees	25 / 153	
Required majority	77 Yes votes out of 153 votes (Absolute majority of the total number of Members of Parliament)	
Yes	83 / 153	check
No	45 / 153	
Abstentions	0 / 153	

Vote of no confidence in Prime Minister Jadranka Kosor
Ballot	28 October 2010	
Absentees	11 / 153	
Required majority	77 Yes votes, Abstentions or Absentees out of 153 votes (Absolute majority of the total number of Members of Parliament)	
Yes	62 / 153	
No	79 / 153	☒
Abstentions	1 / 153	

== Party breakdown ==
Party breakdown of cabinet ministers (23 December 2011):

- Croatian Democratic Union
15
- Croatian Peasant Party
1
- Croatian Social Liberal Party
1
- Independent Democratic Serb Party
1
- Independents
1

== Changes from the Cabinet of Ivo Sanader II ==
- Božidar Pankretić, the former Minister of Agriculture, Fisheries and Rural Development switched posts with Petar Čobanković, the former Minister of Regional Development, Forestry and Water Management.
- Tomislav Ivić was appointed new Minister of Family, Veterans' Affairs and Intergenerational Solidarity, to fill in the vacant seat after former minister Jadranka Kosor became prime minister.
- Bianca Matković was appointed Minister without portfolio.
- New Ministry for Public Administration was formed, with Davorin Mlakar appointed minister.
- Former Minister of Science, Education and Sports Dragan Primorac, who also stepped down the day after Sanader's resignation, was replaced by Radovan Fuchs only days before the Kosor cabinet was officially announced.
- Although initially retained as Minister of Economy, Labour and Entrepreneurship, Damir Polančec resigned three months later on 30 October 2009 and was replaced by Đuro Popijač in November.
- Bianca Matković, who was appointed Minister without portfolio in Kosor's cabinet, was relieved from her post in March 2010. Since no one was appointed to replace her, her post was also terminated.
- In May 2010 Ivan Šimonović was appointed United Nations Assistant Secretary-General for Human Rights. Following the appointment, Šimonović was replaced by Dražen Bošnjaković on 7 July 2010. Bošnjaković previously held the post of state secretary with the Ministry of Justice.
- In July 2010 the Croatian Social Liberal Party (HSLS) decided to leave the ruling coalition. As a result of this, Đurđa Adlešič stepped down from her post of Deputy Prime Minister.
- In December 2010 the government underwent a major reconstruction, which came into effect after the new appointments were approved in a parliament session held on 29 December:
  - Ivan Šuker (HDZ) was replaced by Martina Dalić (HDZ) as Minister of Finance
  - Branko Vukelić (HDZ) was replaced by Davor Božinović (HDZ) as Minister of Defence
  - Marina Matulović-Dropulić (HDZ) was replaced by Branko Bačić (HDZ) as Minister of Environmental Protection, Physical Planning and Construction
  - Božo Biškupić (HDZ) was replaced by Jasen Mesić (HDZ) as Minister of Culture
  - In addition, three new Deputy Prime Ministers were appointed - Domagoj Milošević was named Deputy Prime Minister in charge of major investment projects, Minister of Agriculture, Fisheries and Rural Development Petar Čobanković was named Deputy Prime Minister in charge of the economy, and Minister of Foreign Affairs Gordan Jandroković was appointed Deputy Prime Minister.

== List of ministers and portfolios ==
- Some periods in the table below start before 6 July 2009 because some ministers also served in the Cabinet of Ivo Sanader II (12 January 2008 – 6 July 2009) and Cabinet of Ivo Sanader I (23 December 2003 – 12 January 2008).
- In December 2010 the cabinet had six Deputy Prime Ministers: for Domagoj Ivan Milošević and Slobodan Uzelac these were their only posts in the cabinet, while Darko Milinović, Božidar Pankretić, Petar Čobanković and Gordan Jandroković served as both Deputy Prime Ministers and ministers of their respective portfolios.
- In the following table former members of the cabinet are listed in italic script and current Deputy Prime Ministers are indicated by "(d)".

Minister	Party	Portfolio	Period
Jadranka Kosor	HDZ	Prime Minister	6 July 2009 – 23 December 2011
Đurđa Adlešič	HSLS	Deputy Prime Minister	12 January 2008 – 12 October 2010
Slobodan Uzelac (d)	SDSS	Deputy Prime Minister	12 January 2008 – 23 December 2011
Domagoj Ivan Milošević (d)	HDZ	Deputy Prime Minister	29 December 2010 – 23 December 2011
Božidar Pankretić (d)	HSS	Minister of Regional Development, Forestry and Water Management	6 July 2009 – 23 December 2011
Darko Milinović (d)	HDZ	Minister of Health and Social Welfare	12 January 2008 – 23 December 2011
Ivan Šuker	HDZ	Minister of Finance	23 December 2003 – 29 December 2010
Martina Dalić	HDZ	Minister of Finance	29 December 2010 – 23 December 2011
Damir Bajs	HSS	Minister of Tourism	12 January 2008 – 23 December 2011
Božo Biškupić	HDZ	Minister of Culture	23 December 2003 – 29 December 2010
Jasen Mesić	HDZ	Minister of Culture	29 December 2010 – 23 December 2011
Petar Čobanković (d)	HDZ	Minister of Agriculture, Fisheries and Rural Development	6 July 2009 – 23 December 2011
Tomislav Ivić	HDZ	Minister of Family, Veterans' Affairs and Intergenerational Solidarity	6 July 2009 – 23 December 2011
Gordan Jandroković (d)	HDZ	Minister of Foreign Affairs and European Integration	12 January 2008 – 23 December 2011
Božidar Kalmeta	HDZ	Minister of the Sea, Transport and Infrastructure	23 December 2003 – 23 December 2011
Bianca Matković	HDZ	Without portfolio	6 July 2009 – 24 March 2010
Davorin Mlakar	HDZ	Minister of Public Administration	6 July 2009 – 23 December 2011
Branko Vukelić	HDZ	Minister of Defence	12 January 2008 – 29 December 2010
Davor Božinović	Non-party	Minister of Defence	29 December 2010 – 23 December 2011
Ivan Šimonović	Non-party	Minister of Justice	10 October 2008 – 7 July 2010
Dražen Bošnjaković	HDZ	Minister of Justice	7 July 2010 – 23 December 2011
Marina Matulović-Dropulić	HDZ	Minister of Environmental Protection, Physical Planning and Construction	23 December 2003 – 29 December 2010
Branko Bačić	HDZ	Minister of Environmental Protection, Physical Planning and Construction	29 December 2010 – 23 December 2011
Radovan Fuchs	HDZ	Minister of Science, Education and Sports	2 July 2009 – 23 December 2011
Tomislav Karamarko	HDZ^{[nb 2]}	Minister of the Interior	10 October 2008 – 23 December 2011
Damir Polančec	HDZ	Minister of Economy, Labour and Entrepreneurship	12 January 2008 – 30 October 2009
Đuro Popijač	HDZ ^{[nb 1]}	Minister of Economy, Labour and Entrepreneurship	19 November 2009 – 23 December 2011

=== Notes ===
nb 1. Đuro Popijač was originally appointed as a non-party minister in November 2009, but then joined HDZ while in office in August 2010.

nb 2. Tomislav Karamarko was originally appointed as a non-party minister in October 2008, but then joined HDZ while in office in September 2011.

== Standing in opinion polls ==
Cabinet's approval ratings
Date	Event	Approval (%)	Disapproval (%)	Neutral (%)
27 February 2010	After dealing with corruption and Sanader	54	32	15
30 June 2010	Labour Union referendum	24	60	16
24 February 2011	High unemployment	16	74	10
3 February 2010	Highest approval	57	30	14
4 March 2011	Lowest approval	13.7	74.8	N/A

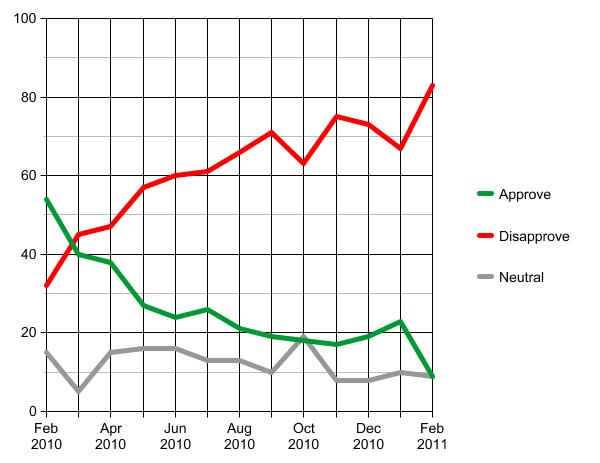
Approval ratings of the government (IpsosPuls Feb 2010-Feb 2011)
