= Cabinet of Ivo Sanader II =

Croatian government (2008–2009)

Second Sanader Cabinet
- 10th Cabinet of the Republic of Croatia

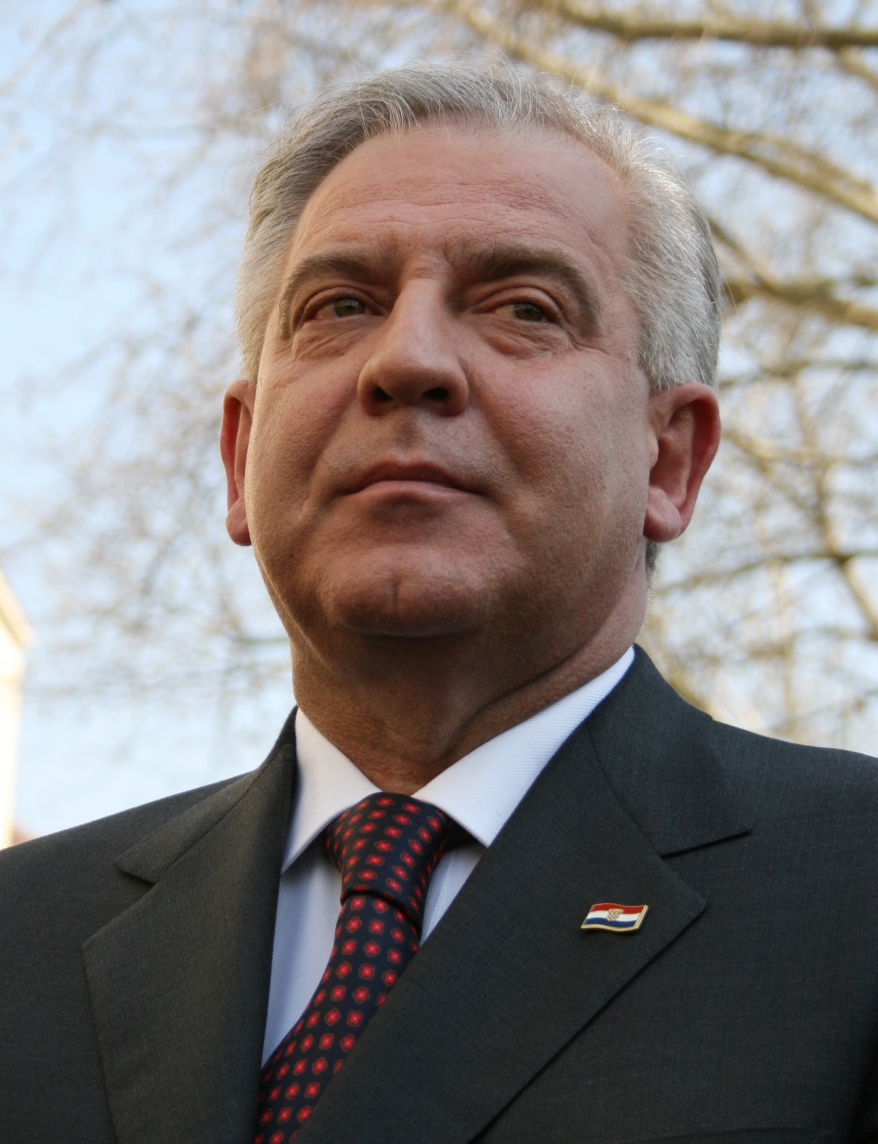
- Date formed: 12 January 2008
- Date dissolved: 6 July 2009

People and organisations
- Head of state: Stjepan Mesić
- Head of government: Ivo Sanader
- Deputy head of government: Jadranka Kosor; Damir Polančec; Đurđa Adlešič; Slobodan Uzelac
- No. of ministers: 18 (on 6 July 2009)
- Ministers removed: 3
- Total no. of members: 21 (including former members)
- Member parties: Croatian Democratic Union; Croatian Peasant Party; Croatian Social Liberal Party; Independent Democratic Serb Party
- Status in legislature: Majority coalition government
- Opposition party: Social Democratic Party
- Opposition leader: Zoran Milanović

History
- Election: 25 November 2007
- Legislature terms: 2008–2011
- Predecessor: Cabinet of Ivo Sanader I
- Successor: Cabinet of Jadranka Kosor

The Tenth Government of the Republic of Croatia (Croatian: Deseta Vlada Republike Hrvatske) was the second of two Croatian Government cabinets led by Prime Minister Ivo Sanader. It was announced on 12 January 2008 and its term ended on 6 July 2009, when Jadranka Kosor formed the 11th cabinet following Sanader's surprise resignation. Cabinet members represented parties of the ruling coalition which was formed following the 2007 parliamentary elections:

- Croatian Democratic Union (HDZ)
- Croatian Social Liberal Party (HSLS)
- Independent Democratic Serb Party (SDSS)
- Croatian Peasant Party (HSS)

It was the first Croatian cabinet since the first multi-party elections in 1990 to have a party representing the Serb minority in Croatia (SDSS) as its member, with Slobodan Uzelac holding office as of one of the Deputy Prime Ministers. This was mainly because this cabinet was heavily dependent on the support of the 8 national minority representatives in the Croatian Parliament, so as to be able to command a parliamentary majority.

== Motions of confidence ==
Vote on the confirmation of the 10th Government of the Republic of Croatia
| Ballot | 12 January 2008 | |
|---|---|---|
| Absentees | 9 / 153 | |
| Required majority | 77 Yes votes out of 153 votes (Absolute majority of the total number of Members of Parliament) | |
| Yes | 82 / 153 | check |
| No | 62 / 153 | |
| Abstentions | 0 / 153 | |

== Party breakdown ==
Party breakdown of cabinet ministers (6 July 2009):

- Croatian Democratic Union
11
- Croatian Peasant Party
2

- Croatian Social Liberal Party
1
- Independent Democratic Serb Party
1

== Changes from the Cabinet of Ivo Sanader I ==
- In order to accommodate coalition partners, the number of Deputy Prime ministers grew to four from two in the previous cabinet (with two posts held by HDZ members Kosor and Polančec and the additional two by Adlešič of HSLS and Uzelac of SDSS).
- The Ministry of Agriculture, Forest and Water Management was split into the Ministry of Regional Development, Forestry and Water Management was established (headed by Petar Čobanković (HDZ) who also headed the old ministry), and Ministry of Agriculture, Fisheries and Rural Development (which was taken over by Božidar Pankretić of HSS). The latter ministry was formed mainly to accommodate HSS demands which ran on a platform seeking to stimulate re-development of rural areas.
- After five years, Ministry of Tourism was separated from what was earlier Ministry of the Sea, Tourism, Transport and Development and Damir Bajs (HSS) was appointed new Minister of Tourism. The Ministry of Tourism had earlier existed from 1990 to 1992 under PMs Mesić, Manolić and Gregurić and from 1993 to 2003 under Valentić, Mateša and Račan.

== List of ministers and portfolios ==
Some periods in the table below start before 12 January 2008 because the minister also served in the Cabinet of Ivo Sanader I (23 December 2003 – 12 January 2008) and extend beyond 6 July 2009 in case of ministers who continued to hold posts in the following Cabinet of Jadranka Kosor. The cabinet had four Deputy Prime Ministers: for Đurđa Adlešič and Slobodan Uzelac these were their only posts in the cabinet, while Jadranka Kosor and Damir Polančec served as both Deputy Prime Ministers and ministers of their respective portfolios.

| Minister | Party | Portfolio | Term start | Term end |
|---|---|---|---|---|
| Ivo Sanader | HDZ | Prime Minister | 23 December 2003 | 6 July 2009 |
| Đurđa Adlešič (D) | HSLS | Deputy Prime Minister | 12 January 2008 | 12 October 2010 |
| Slobodan Uzelac (D) | SDSS | Deputy Prime Minister | 12 January 2008 | 23 December 2011 |
| Božo Biškupić | HDZ | Culture | 23 December 2003 | 29 December 2010 |
| Petar Čobanković | HDZ | Regional Development, Forestry and Water Management | 12 January 2008 | 6 July 2009 |
| Gordan Jandroković | HDZ | Foreign Affairs and European Integration | 12 January 2008 | 23 December 2011 |
| Božidar Kalmeta | HDZ | Sea, Transport and Infrastructure | 23 December 2003 | 23 December 2011 |
| Jadranka Kosor (D) | HDZ | Family, Veterans' Affairs and Inter-generational Solidarity | 23 December 2003 | 6 July 2009 |
| Ana Lovrin | HDZ | Justice | 10 February 2006 | 10 October 2008 |
| Marina Matulović-Dropulić | HDZ | Environmental Protection, Spatial Planning and Construction | 23 December 2003 | 29 December 2010 |
| Darko Milinović | HDZ | Health and Social Welfare | 12 January 2008 | 23 December 2011 |
| Damir Polančec (D) | HDZ | Economy, Labour and Entrepreneurship | 12 January 2008 | 30 October 2009 |
| Dragan Primorac | HDZ | Science, Education and Sports | 23 December 2003 | 2 July 2009 |
| Berislav Rončević | HDZ | Interior | 12 January 2008 | 10 October 2008 |
| Ivan Šuker | HDZ | Finance | 23 December 2003 | 29 December 2010 |
| Branko Vukelić | HDZ | Defence | 12 January 2008 | 29 December 2010 |
| Damir Bajs | HSS | Tourism | 12 January 2008 | 23 December 2011 |
| Božidar Pankretić | HSS | Agriculture, Fisheries and Rural Development | 12 January 2008 | 6 July 2009 |

== Changes ==
| Date | Gain | Loss | Note |
|---|---|---|---|
| 10 October 2008 | Non-party | HDZ | Interior minister Berislav Rončević (HDZ), and Justice minister Ana Lovrin (HDZ), are replaced by non-party appointees Tomislav Karamarko and Ivan Šimonović respectively. |
| 2 July 2009 | HDZ | HDZ | Education minister Dragan Primorac (HDZ) was replaced by Radovan Fuchs (HDZ). |
