= Cabinet of Ivo Sanader I =

Croatian government (2003–2008)

First Sanader Cabinet
- 9th Cabinet of the Republic of Croatia

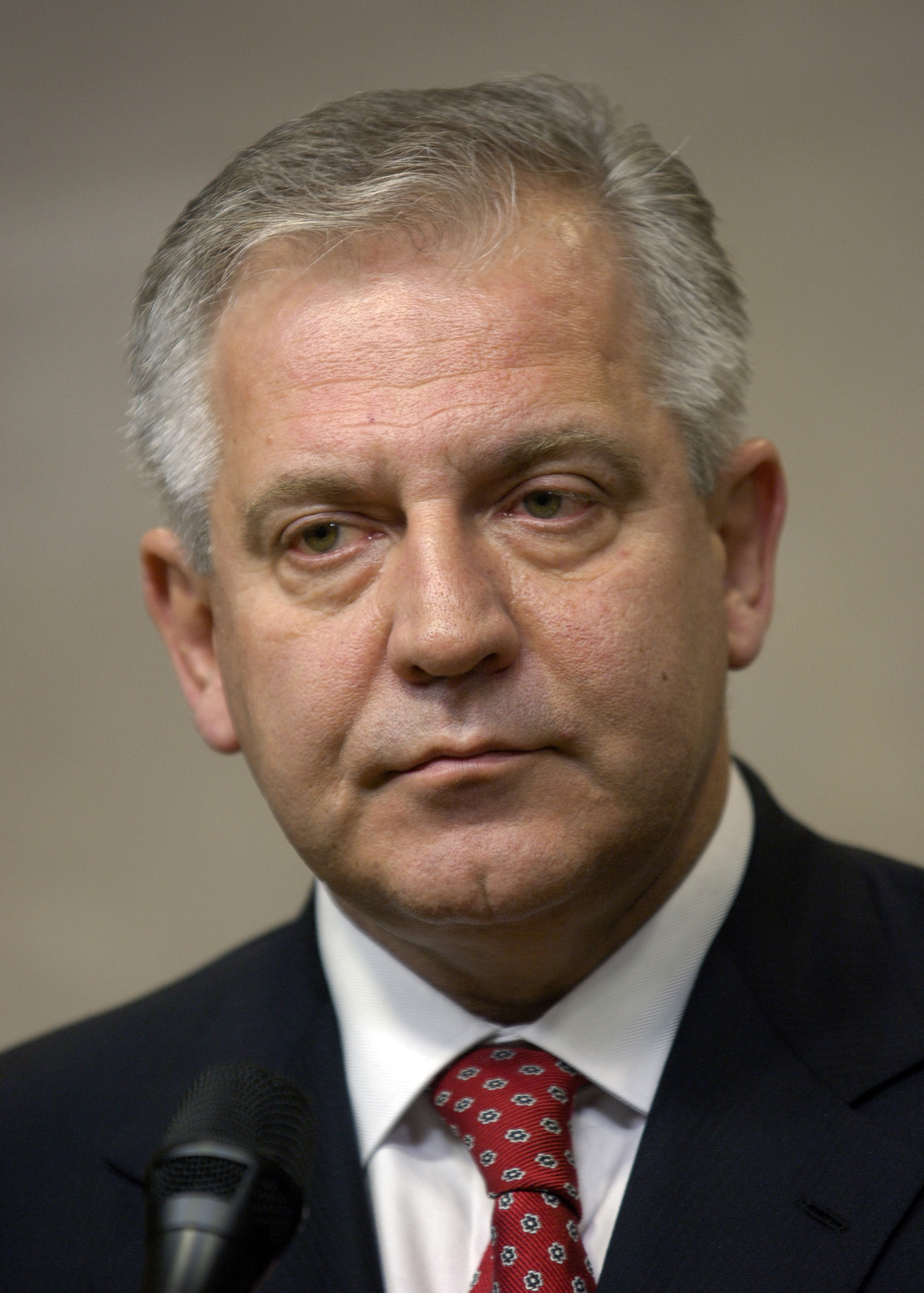
- Date formed: 23 December 2003
- Date dissolved: 12 January 2008

People and organisations
- Head of state: Stjepan Mesić
- Head of government: Ivo Sanader
- Deputy head of government: Jadranka Kosor; Andrija Hebrang (2003–2005); Damir Polančec (2005–2008)
- No. of ministers: 14 (on 12 January 2008)
- Ministers removed: 5
- Total no. of members: 19 (including former members)
- Member parties: Croatian Democratic Union; Democratic Centre (with support from HSLS, HSS and SDSS)
- Status in legislature: Minority coalition government
- Opposition party: Social Democratic Party
- Opposition leader: Ivica Račan (2003–2007); Zoran Milanović (2007)

History
- Elections: 23 November 2003; 25 November 2007
- Legislature terms: 2003–2007
- Predecessor: Cabinet of Ivica Račan II
- Successor: Cabinet of Ivo Sanader II

The Ninth Government of the Republic of Croatia (Croatian: Deveta Vlada Republike Hrvatske) was the first of two Croatian Government cabinets led by Prime Minister Ivo Sanader. It was announced on 23 December 2003 and its term ended on 12 January 2008. All but two cabinet members came from the ruling Croatian Democratic Union (HDZ) party, following their win in the 2003 parliamentary elections (with the exception of Dragan Primorac, who was formally a non-party minister at the time of his appointment, but later joined HDZ and Vesna Škare-Ožbolt who had been a member of HDZ in the 1990s but then joined the Democratic Centre, a small centre-right party which allied with HDZ after the 2003 elections).

== Motions of confidence ==
Vote on the confirmation of the 9th Government of the Republic of Croatia
| Ballot | 23 December 2003 | |
|---|---|---|
| Absentees | 21 / 152 | |
| Required majority | 77 Yes votes out of 152 votes (Absolute majority of the total number of Members of Parliament) | |
| Yes | 88 / 152 | check |
| No | 29 / 152 | |
| Abstentions | 14 / 152 | |

== Party breakdown ==
Party breakdown of cabinet ministers (12 January 2008):

- Croatian Democratic Union
- Independent
13
1

== Changes from Cabinet of Ivica Račan II ==
Since Račan's centre-left coalition was replaced by the centre-right HDZ government, all the ministers were newly appointed. Furthermore, some ministries were re-organised:

- Ministry of Labour and Social Welfare was dissolved; it was then merged into Ministry of Health (which then became Ministry of Health and Social Welfare) and Ministry of Economy.
- Ministry for Crafts, Small and Medium-sized entrepreneurship was also dissolved and merged with the Ministry of Economy, which then became Ministry of Economy, Labour and Entrepreneurship
- Ministry of Agriculture and Forest Management was renamed Ministry of Agriculture, Forest and Water Management
- Ministry of Veterans' Affairs was renamed and expanded into Minister of Family, Veterans' Affairs and Intergenerational Solidarity
- Ministry of Tourism was dissolved and merged with Ministry of Maritime Affairs, Transport and Communications to form the new Ministry of the Sea, Tourism, Transport and Development
- Ministry of Justice, Public Administration and Local Self-government was renamed simply Ministry of Justice
- Minister of Public Works, Construction and Reconstruction was dissolved, and merged with the Ministry of Environmental Protection and Physical Planning to form the Ministry of Environmental Protection, Physical Planning and Construction
- Ministry of Science and Technology and Ministry of Education and Sports were merged into Ministry of Science, Education and Sports

These changes had brought down the number of ministries from 19 in Račan's cabinet to 14 under PM Sanader. Also, the ministries of European Integration (headed by Kolinda Grabar-Kitarović) and Foreign Affairs (headed by Miomir Žužul) were later merged in February 2005, which further reduced the total number of government ministries to just 13.

== List of ministers and portfolios ==
Some periods in the table extend after before 12 January 2008 because the minister continued to hold the post in the following Cabinet of Ivo Sanader II and Cabinet of Jadranka Kosor. The cabinet had two Deputy Prime Ministers: Jadranka Kosor and Andrija Hebrang, who both also served as ministers of their respective portfolios. When Hebrang resigned from both his posts as Deputy Prime Minister and Minister of Health and Social Welfare in February 2005, he was replaced by Damir Polančec (as Deputy Prime Minister) and Neven Ljubičić (who took over his portfolio).

| Minister | Party | Portfolio | Term start | Term end |
|---|---|---|---|---|
| Ivo Sanader | HDZ | Prime Minister | 23 December 2003 | 6 July 2009 |
| Damir Polančec | HDZ | Deputy Prime Minister | 17 February 2005 | 12 January 2008 |
| Petar Čobanković | HDZ | Agriculture, Forestry and Water Management | 23 December 2003 | 12 January 2008 |
| Božo Biškupić | HDZ | Culture | 23 December 2003 | 29 December 2010 |
| Berislav Rončević | HDZ | Defence | 23 December 2003 | 12 January 2008 |
| Jadranka Kosor | HDZ | Family, Veterans' Affairs and Inter-generational Solidarity | 23 December 2003 | 6 July 2009 |
| Ivan Šuker | HDZ | Finance | 23 December 2003 | 29 December 2010 |
| Miomir Žužul | HDZ | Foreign Affairs | 17 February 2005 | 16 February 2005 |
| Kolinda Grabar-Kitarović | HDZ | European Integration | 23 December 2003 | 16 February 2005 |
| Kolinda Grabar-Kitarović | HDZ | Foreign Affairs and European Integration | 17 February 2005 | 12 January 2008 |
| Andrija Hebrang | HDZ | Health and Social Welfare | 23 December 2003 | 15 February 2005 |
| Neven Ljubičić | HDZ | Health and Social Welfare | 16 February 2005 | 12 January 2008 |
| Božidar Kalmeta | HDZ | Sea, Tourism, Transport and Development | 23 December 2003 | 23 December 2011 |
| Vesna Škare-Ožbolt | DC | Justice | 23 December 2003 | 9 February 2006 |
| Ana Lovrin | HDZ | Justice | 10 February 2006 | 10 October 2008 |
| Marina Matulović-Dropulić | HDZ | Environment Protection, Spatial Planning and Construction | 23 December 2003 | 29 December 2010 |
| Dragan Primorac | Non-party | Science, Education and Sports | 23 December 2003 | 2 July 2009 |
| Marijan Mlinarić | HDZ | Interior | 23 December 2003 | 12 July 2005 |
| Ivica Kirin | HDZ | Interior | 12 July 2005 | 2 January 2008 |
| Branko Vukelić | HDZ | Economy, Labour and Entrepreneurship | 23 December 2003 | 12 January 2008 |
