= Ana Lovrin =

Croatian politician

Minister of Justice
- In office 10 February 2006 – 10 October 2008
- Prime Minister: Ivo Sanader
- Preceded by: Vesna Škare-Ožbolt
- Succeeded by: Ivan Šimonović

Personal details
- Born: 2 December 1953 (age 72) Zagreb, SR Croatia, SFR Yugoslavia
- Party: Croatian Democratic Union
- Children: 4
- Education: University of Zagreb

Ana Lovrin (Croatian pronunciation: [âna lǒːʋrin] or [ǎːna-]; born 2 December 1953) is a Croatian politician. She held the post of Minister of Justice in the first and second cabinets under Prime Minister Ivo Sanader, from February 2006 to October 2008. She was the third female holder of that office, as well as being the third consecutive woman after Ingrid Antičević-Marinović and Vesna Škare-Ožbolt.

Lovrin was born in Zagreb and graduated from the University of Zagreb Faculty of Law. A member of the Croatian Democratic Union (HDZ) since 1993, Lovrin held several party and political posts in the city of Zadar, where she was deputy mayor under Božidar Kalmeta. After Kalmeta was appointed Minister in December 2003, she replaced him as mayor of Zadar. That same year she was also appointed chairman of Zadar HDZ, member of the Zadar County HDZ, and was made member of the HDZ central committee. In February 2006 she was also appointed minister, replacing Vesna Škare-Ožbolt, and continued to hold the post until October 2008 when she was replaced by a non-party minister Ivan Šimonović.

She was also elected to the 5th and 6th assembly of the Croatian Parliament, and currently serves as chairman of the parliamentary justice committee.

== Family ==
Lovrin is married and a mother of four daughters.

Political offices
Preceded by Božidar Kalmeta	Mayor of Zadar; 2003–2005	Succeeded by Živko Kolega
Preceded by Vesna Škare-Ožbolt	Minister of Justice; 2006–2008	Succeeded by Ivan Šimonović
