= Mislav Bago =

Croatian journalist and broadcaster (1973–2022)

- Born: 13 September 1973; Zagreb, Croatia
- Died: 18 August 2022 (aged 48); Zagreb, Croatia
- Education: Faculty of Political Sciences in Zagreb
- Occupation: Journalist
- Awards: Marija Jurić Zagorka award (1998, 2003, 2006)

Mislav Bago (13 September 1973 – 18 August 2022) was a Croatian journalist and broadcaster. The winner of a number of awards and decorations, Bago was known as one of the best Croatian TV journalists, and he was known for his unwavering attitude and questions with which he would put his interlocutors, often high-ranking individuals from domestic politics, into very awkward situations.

== Biography ==
Bago was born in Zagreb in 1973. He finished elementary school in Velika Gorica and high school in Zagreb, after which he entered the Faculty of Political Sciences in Zagreb, where he graduated.

After graduation, he got a job at Croatian Radiotelevision, where he specialized in topics from national politics, especially elections. From 2006 to 2008, he was the editor of the HRT show Otvoreno, and in 2009 he moved to Nova TV, where he worked until his sudden death in August 2022; the cause of death was not given.

He was also the vice president of Croatian Journalists' Association. He died in Zagreb in 2022.

== Awards ==
Bago received a number of awards and recognitions during his lifetime. He received the Marija Jurić Zagorka award for the first time in 1998 for the best reportage, and in 2003 and 2006 for the best interview. In 2006, he interviewed former prime ministers Ivica Račan and Ivo Sanader, for which he received the Croatian Journalists' Association award Journalist of the Year. In 2013 European Movement (B&H) recognized him as the regional journalist of the year.
