= Jabuka TV =

Television station in Zagreb, Croatia

- Country: Croatia
- Broadcast area: D4, Zagreb County
- Headquarters: Zagreb, Croatia

Programming
- Language(s): Croatian
- Picture format: 720p HDTV

Ownership
- Owner: V. Grubišić, R. Bolković and Ž. Pervan (Originally)

History
- Launched: 25 May 1989; 35 years ago
- Former names: OTV (Omladinska Televizija, Otvorena Televizija)

Links
- Website: www.jabukatv.hr

Jabuka TV (lit. "Apple TV"), formerly known as Otvorena televizija ("Open TV"), is a local television station in Zagreb, Croatia.

== History ==
Former OTV logo

It began broadcasting in 1989 as OTV (Omladinska TV), becoming the first commercial television station on the territories of former Yugoslavia, as well as the first independent television house. It played a major role in the further development of freedom of speech in the country, since it allowed politics and views which were previously rare or risky to espouse. It, thus, became one of the leading local TV channels in the country, and an alternative to state television. It changed its name to Otvorena Televizija in 1994.

In 2011, it was rebranded as Jabuka TV (Apple TV).

== Notable shows ==
- Serbus Zagreb (1989–)
- Nightmare Stage (1992–2005)
- Večernja škola (1995–1998)
- Laku noć, Hrvatska (2006–2008)
