= Slobodan Uzelac =

Croatian politician

- Слободан Узелац
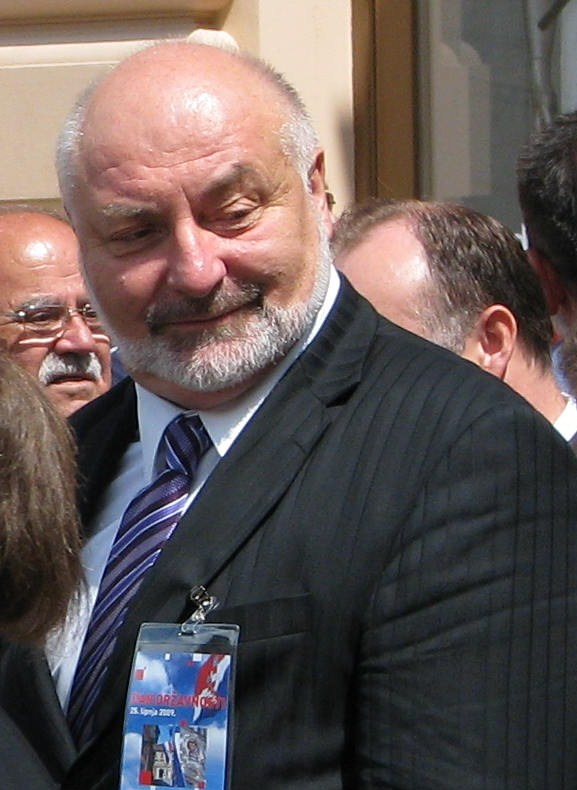

Deputy Prime Minister of Croatia
- In office 12 January 2008 – 23 December 2011
- Prime Minister: Ivo Sanader; Jadranka Kosor
- Preceded by: Position established
- Succeeded by: Radimir Čačić

Minister without portfolio Responsibility for Regional Development, Reconstruction and Return
- In office 12 January 2008 – 23 December 2011
- Prime Minister: Ivo Sanader; Jadranka Kosor

Personal details
- Born: 9 August 1947 (age 78) Kakma, PR Croatia, FPR Yugoslavia
- Party: Independent Democratic Serb Party
- Education: University of Belgrade
- Profession: Defectologist

Slobodan Uzelac (Serbian Cyrillic: Слободан Узелац; born 9 August 1947) is a Croatian Serb politician who served as Deputy Prime Minister of Croatia for Regional Development, Reconstruction and Return in the second cabinet of Prime Minister Ivo Sanader and his successor in that position Jadranka Kosor. He is the first member of the Serb minority in Croatia to hold a cabinet position since the first Croatian multi-party elections were held in 1990.

== Biography ==
He offered his resignation in March 2008, after the Government of Croatia recognized Kosovo's declaration of independence However, Prime Minister Ivo Sanader did not accept his resignation, and the Independent Democratic Serb Party subsequently decided against withdrawing its member from the government.

Slobodan Uzelac received his Ph.D. in medicine from the University of Belgrade (Belgrade Medical School) in 1981. He was a guest lecturer at the Penn State University in 2001.

Uzelac is the president of Serbian Cultural Society Prosvjeta.

In addition to Serbo-Croatian, Uzelac also speaks English and Russian. He is a member of the advisory board of the democratic left magazine Novi Plamen.
