= Veljko Ostojić =

Croatian politician

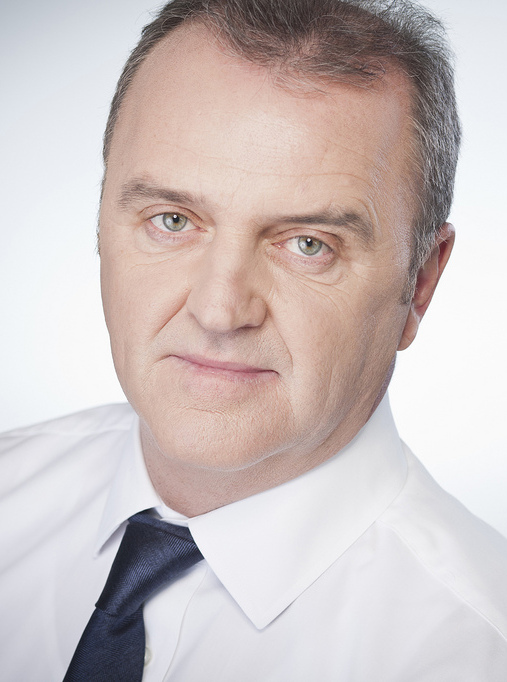

Minister of Tourism
- In office 23 December 2011 – 9 March 2013
- Preceded by: Damir Bajs
- Succeeded by: Oleg Valjalo (Acting)

Personal details
- Born: 13 October 1958 (age 67) Pazin, PR Croatia, FPR Yugoslavia (modern Croatia)
- Party: Istrian Democratic Assembly

Veljko Ostojić (born 13 October 1958) is a Croatian politician.

Ostojić was named minister of tourism as the lone member of the Istrian Democratic Assembly (IDS) in the cabinet of Zoran Milanović on 23 December 2011. On 9 March 2013 he resigned due to media revelations of his family profiting from a sale of land due to a change in planning laws in the IDS governed Istria County.

Political offices
Preceded by Damir Bajs	Minister of Tourism; 2011–2013	Succeeded by Oleg Valjalo; Acting
