= Rudine derailment =

2009 train derailment in Croatia

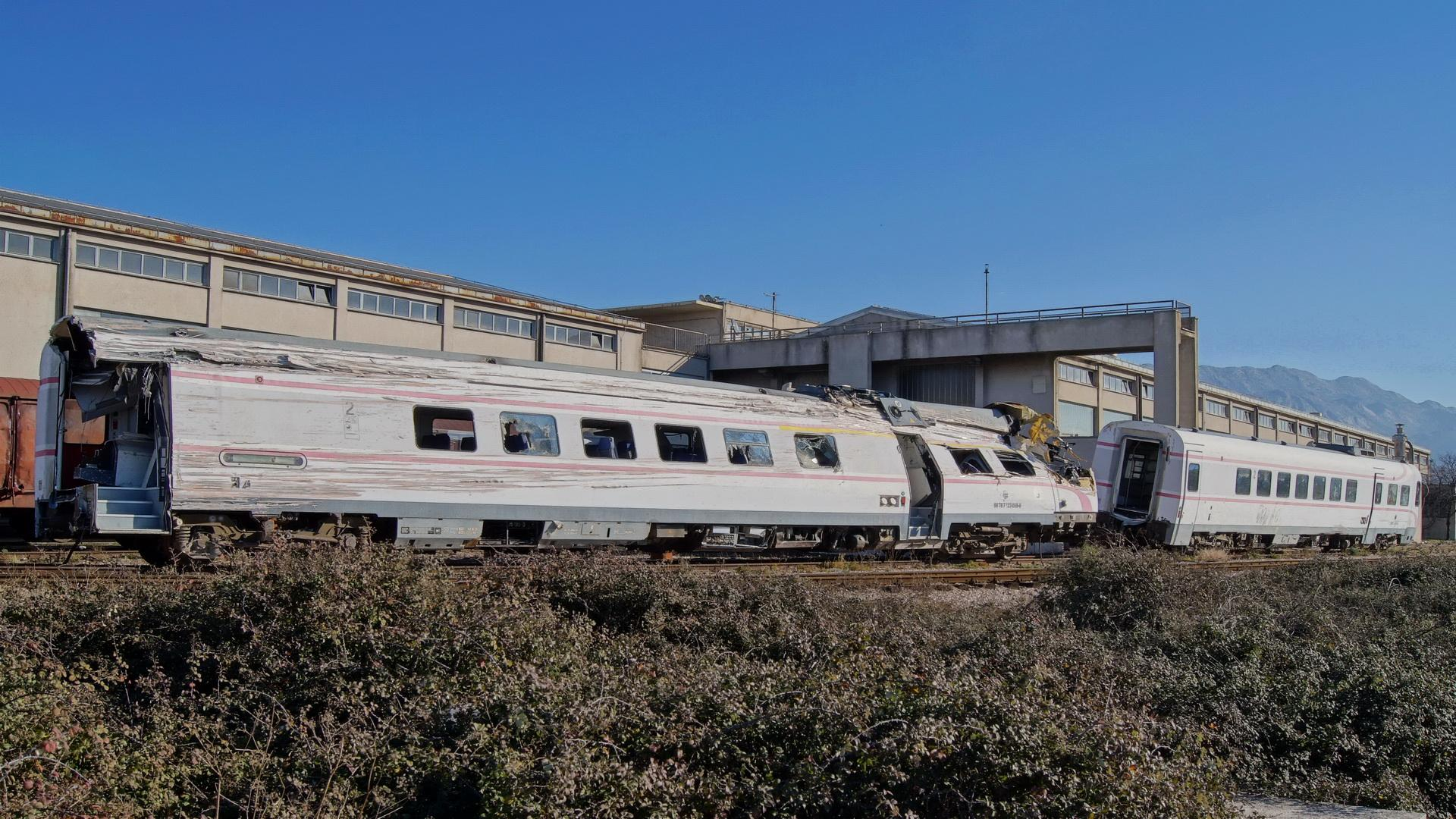
- Remains of the train, as seen in Solin near Split, on 27 January 2012. (The other car is placed back-front.)

Details
- Date: 24 July 2009; 12:08
- Location: Rudine, Kaštela
- Coordinates: 43.570115°N 16.311307°E (est.)
- Country: Croatia
- Line: Zagreb to Split
- Operator: Croatian Railways
- Incident type: Derailment
- Cause: Excessive speed caused by braking failure

Statistics
- Trains: 1
- Deaths: 6
- Injured: 55

Site of the derailment (Croatia)

The Rudine derailment was a train derailment that happened on 24 July 2009 at 10:08 GMT near the village of Rudine in southern Croatia, on the Zagreb-Split railway line. The derailment site is located on the slopes of Kozjak. The accident caused the deaths of 6 people, and 55 were injured.

Croatian media say that this is the worst railway accident to have occurred in independent Croatia to date, adding that if the train had derailed into a ravine 30 m ahead, the death toll could have been much higher.

== Details ==
The accident happened when the two-carriage tilting train of the RegioSwinger type carrying about 90 passengers derailed at 10:08 GMT (12:08 local time) in a remote area near the village of Rudine, around 30 km (19 mi) from its destination. The front carriage hit the sides of a cut through a hillside twice, before breaking apart from the second impact.

According to Croatian news reports, the cause of the derailment was slippery fire retardant that was just sprayed on a steep downhill section of the track, a normal practice in extreme summer heat but executed improperly using a new chemical. With brakes ineffective, the train gained a speed higher than the track configuration could handle and derailed.

== Investigation ==
From the very beginning of the rescue operation, the initial investigation was focused on the fire retardant that was sprayed on the railroad approximately 10 minutes before the derailment. Investigators were suspicious about traction on the tracks because the rescue train, which was coincidentally the same railway service vehicle that supported spraying of the fire retardant, suffered a loss of braking and derailed at the same location as the passenger train, narrowly missing rescuers who were cleaning up the accident site.

On 27 July 2009, a cleaning operation on the 11 km (6.8 mi) stretch of railroad between the stations Kaštel Stari and Labin Dalmatinski begun, but was stopped within an hour because of a new discovery important for the investigation. The cleaning teams followed the fire retardant supplier's directions and washed the tracks with hot water. However, the cleaning supervisor quickly noticed that while most of the retardant washed off, a yellow-brown film of an unknown slippery substance remained on the tracks. A sample of the substance was taken as evidence and sent to Zagreb for chemical analysis. According to the TG-300 retardant description, it is an "aqueous based resin liquid penetrate" but its exact composition is unpublished. Three days after this accident, the fire retardant manufacturer added a warning "do not spray on tracks" to their TG-300 web site.

== Aftermath ==
Police brought to the interview responsible people from the HŽ supply office as well as the responsible people from the company that had imported retardant. Director of HŽ Infrastructure, a company within HŽ Holding, and two of his associates were removed from their positions by the act of the Minister of Transport Božidar Kalmeta. Two people who played the most important role with purchase and application of the retardant were, by the order of new HŽ Infrastructure director, put on suspension and subsequently fired from the company.

Sixteen of the total of 55 injured passengers had remained in treatment in the Split central hospital for several weeks. The driver, Josip Palinić was discharged after his physical injuries were treated, and was not charged with any wrongdoing by the police. Criminal charges were brought upon Ivan Medak, the chief of ecology of HŽ Infrastruktura, Drago Rogulj, chief of the fire department of HŽ Split, Ivan Tomašković, the director of Intrade, Jozo Bazina, Intrade employee, and Branko Tišljar, a fireman involved in the spreading of the fire retardant. Croatian police continued to investigate and reveal the circumstances of the obtainment as well as application of the fire retardant, prompting widespread consternation in the Croatian press and public regarding the state of management and mishandling of public tenders in the Croatian Railways.

After recovering the wreckage from the site and needed track repair, the traffic was resumed on 2 August 2009 at 20:00 GMT for freight traffic only, while the scheduled passenger service resumed the day after on 3 August 2009 at 4:00 GMT.

== Trial ==
On 13 April 2010, the County Attorney in Split indicted Ivan Medak, Ivan Tomašković, Jozo Bazina, Drago Rogulj and Branko Tišljar in court on criminal charges of premeditated general gross negligence with fatal consequences. In a May 2013 verdict, Medak and Bazina were sentenced to four and three years in prison respectively, and the rest of the defendants were acquitted.
