= Ivica Kirin =

Croatian politician

Minister of the Interior
- In office 17 February 2005 – 2 January 2008
- Prime Minister: Ivo Sanader
- Preceded by: Marijan Mlinarić
- Succeeded by: Berislav Rončević

Personal details
- Born: 14 June 1970 (age 56) Virovitica, SR Croatia, SFR Yugoslavia
- Party: Croatian Democratic Union
- Education: University of Zagreb

Ivica Kirin (born 14 June 1970) is a Croatian politician who was the interior minister of Croatia from 2005 to 2008.

He resigned as interior minister on 29 December 2007 after being pictured with Mladen Markač on a boar hunt. Markač was on parole from the International Criminal Tribunal for the former Yugoslavia and was not permitted to leave his house as a condition of his parole. Kirin, as interior minister, was responsible for ensuring Markač fulfilled his parole conditions.

== Career ==
Kirin received his degree in Geotechnical engineering from the Geotechnical Engineering Faculty in Varaždin in 1994. He went on to work for a geotechnical engineering firm the following year.

Kirin is a member of the Croatian Democratic Union party and became Mayor of Virovitica after local elections in 2003. In July 2005 he became interior minister and was the youngest member of Ivo Sanader's cabinet.
