= Petar Čobanković =

Croatian politician (born 1957)

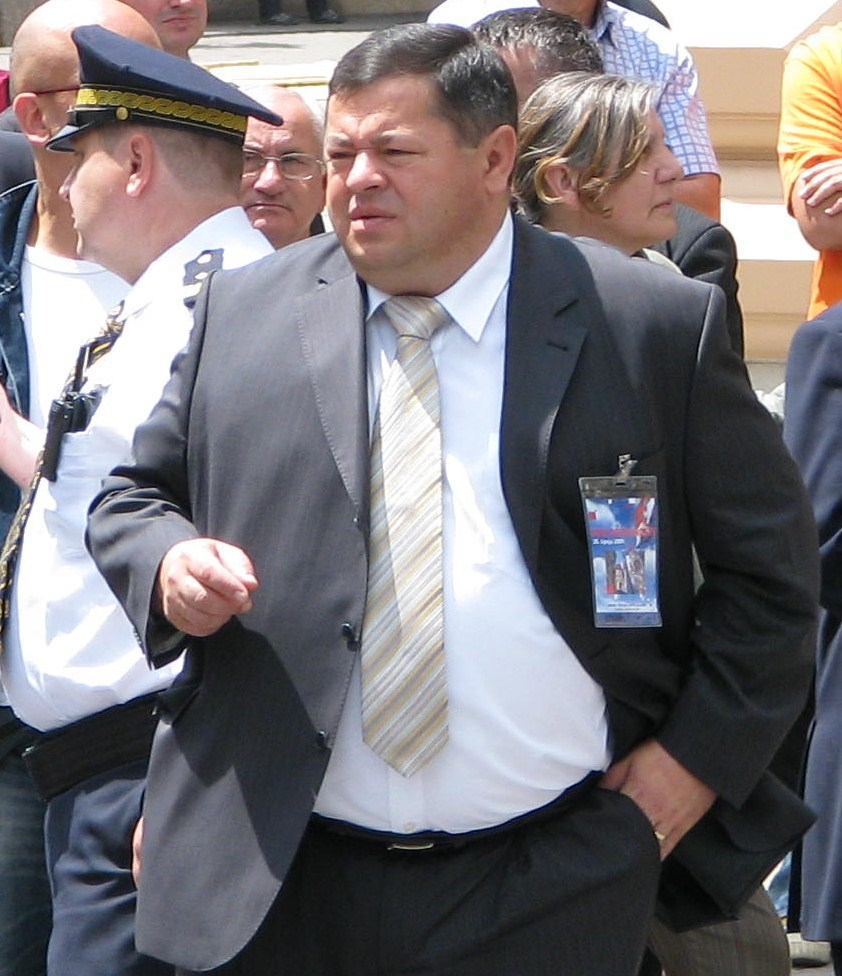

Deputy Prime Minister of Croatia
- In office 29 December 2010 – 23 December 2011
- Prime Minister: Jadranka Kosor
- Preceded by: Ivan Šuker
- Succeeded by: Branko Grčić

Minister of Regional Development, Forestry and Water Management
- In office 12 January 2008 – 23 December 2011
- Prime Minister: Ivo Sanader (until 2009); Jadranka Kosor
- Preceded by: Office established

Minister of Agriculture, Forestry and Water Management
- In office 23 December 2003 – 12 January 2008
- Preceded by: Office established
- Succeeded by: Božidar Pankretić (as Minister of Agriculture, Fisheries and Rural Development)

Personal details
- Born: 29 January 1957 (age 69) Ilok, PR Croatia, , FPR Yugoslavia (modern Croatia)
- Party: Croatian Democratic Union
- Spouse: Anica Čobanković
- Nickname: Debeli

Petar Čobanković (born 29 January 1957) is a former Croatian politician who served as Minister of Regional Development, Forestry and Water Management.

Čobanković finished elementary and high school in Ilok, after that he attended Faculty of Agriculture at University of Zagreb where he obtained his B.Sc. in agriculture. From 2000 until 2001 he was Prefect of Vukovar-Syrmia County. Between 2003 and 2008 he was the Minister of Agriculture, Forestry and Water Management in the Cabinet of Ivo Sanader I. On January 12, 2008 he was named Minister of Regional Development, Forestry and Water Management in the Cabinet of Ivo Sanader II. In 2010 he became deputy prime minister of Government of Croatia in the Cabinet of Jadranka Kosor.

Čobanković pleaded guilty and he was sentenced in March 2013 to one year in jail for corruption. The sentence was consequently reduced to a community sentence in an exchange for full cooperation with the prosecutor in the corruption case against the former Croatian premier Ivo Sanader.
