= Vesna Škare-Ožbolt =

Croatian politician

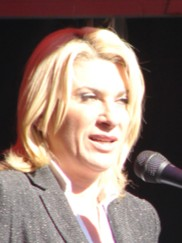

Minister of Justice
- In office 23 December 2003 – 10 February 2006
- Prime Minister: Ivo Sanader
- Preceded by: Ingrid Antičević-Marinović
- Succeeded by: Ana Lovrin

Personal details
- Born: Vesna Škare; 20 June 1961 (age 65) Osijek, PR Croatia, FPR Yugoslavia (modern Croatia)
- Party: Democratic Centre (2000–2015)
- Spouse: Zlatko Ožbolt
- Children: 2
- Education: University of Zagreb

Vesna Škare-Ožbolt (Croatian pronunciation: [ʋêsna ʃkǎːre ǒʒboːlt]; born 20 June 1961) is a Croatian politician. She was the 10th Minister of Justice of Croatia from 2003 until 2006. She was the second female holder of that office, as well as the second consecutive woman after Ingrid Antičević-Marinović.

== Career ==
Before the first democratic elections in 1990, she worked in Croatian judiciary. In the 1990s she joined the Croatian Democratic Union (HDZ) and became one of the advisors to President Franjo Tuđman.

In the late 1990s she handled negotiations leading to the peaceful integration of Eastern Slavonia, Baranja and Western Syrmia into Croatia. After the defeat of the HDZ party in the 2000 parliamentary elections, Škare-Ožbolt, widely perceived as a moderate, left that party and followed Mate Granić to newly formed Democratic Centre (DC).

Three years later, she won a seat in Parliament (Sabor), which turned out to be the only one for the DC Party. After Granić resigned she took the leadership of DC and joined the government of Ivo Sanader as the minister of justice. She was the only non-HDZ minister in Sanader's cabinet.

The Croatian judiciary has generally been perceived as one of the most corrupt and most inefficient branches of government. Škare-Ožbolt launched a highly publicised drive for reform, most notably by trying to digitalise the land registries, which have been notoriously inaccessible.

On 10 February 2006, Sanader dismissed Škare-Ožbolt and replaced her with Ana Lovrin, an HDZ member. Škare-Ožbolt's party failed to get any seats at the November 2007 parliamentary elections. In summer of 2009 she announced her candidacy in the 2009–10 Croatian presidential election. She won 1.89% of the vote in the first round and was eliminated.

Political offices
Preceded by Ingrid Antičević-Marinović	Minister of Justice; 2003–2006	Succeeded by Ana Lovrin
Party political offices
Preceded by Mate Granić	President of the Democratic Centre; 2003–2015	Party dissolved
