= Berislav Rončević =

Croatian politician (born 1960)

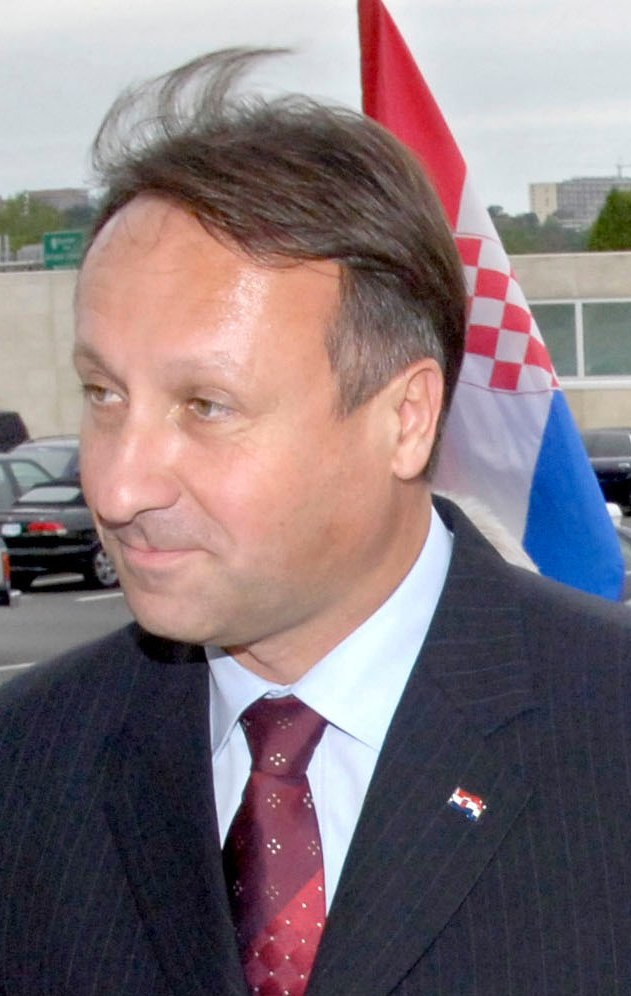
- Rončević in 2006

Minister of Defence
- In office 23 December 2003 – 12 January 2008
- Prime Minister: Ivo Sanader
- Preceded by: Željka Antunović
- Succeeded by: Branko Vukelić

Minister of the Interior
- In office 12 January 2008 – 10 October 2008
- Prime Minister: Ivo Sanader
- Preceded by: Ivica Kirin
- Succeeded by: Tomislav Karamarko

Personal details
- Born: 23 June 1960 (age 66) Borovik, Đakovo, FPR Yugoslavia
- Party: Croatian Democratic Union
- Education: University of Zagreb

Berislav Rončević (born 23 June 1960) is a Croatian politician, and the former Minister of Internal Affairs in the government of Croatia and the Minister of Defense.

Rončević was born in the village of Borovik near Đakovo. He graduated from the Faculty of Law, University of Zagreb in 1985.

Rončević has been a member of the Croatian Democratic Union (HDZ) since 1990. He began his political career in the party in the town of Našice, and afterwards within the Osijek-Baranja County. He was assistant to the mayor, and later mayor of Našice himself. He has been a representative in the Parliament of Croatia since 2000. After parliamentary elections in 2003 he took on the portfolio of defence minister.

In December 2010, Rončević was sentenced to four years in prison for alleged improprieties during acquisition of army trucks in 2004. After his guilty verdict was vacated by the Supreme Court in April 2013, Rončević was acquitted in the second trial in January 2014.

Rončević is married and a father of four.
