= Ingrid Antičević-Marinović =

Croatian lawyer and politician

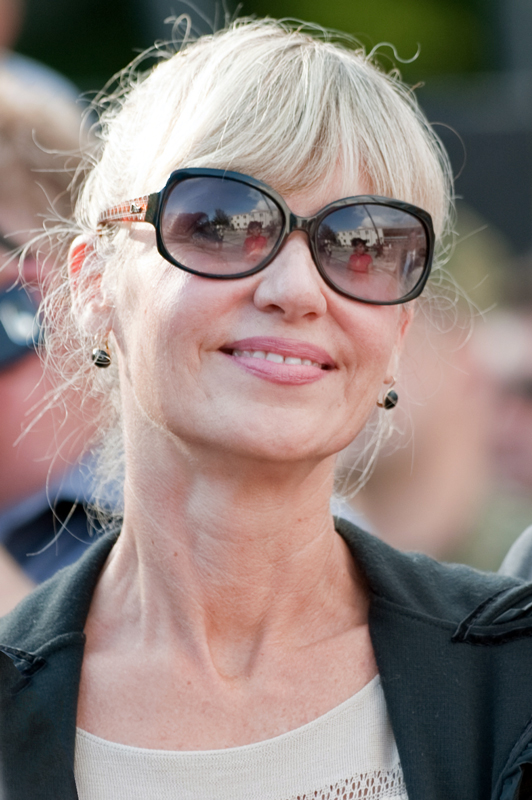

Justice of the Constitutional Court of Croatia
- In office 7 June 2016 – 7 December 2024

Minister of Justice, Public Administration and Local Self-government
- In office 28 September 2001 – 23 December 2003
- President: Stjepan Mesić
- Prime Minister: Ivica Račan
- Preceded by: Stjepan Ivanišević
- Succeeded by: Vesna Škare-Ožbolt

Personal details
- Born: Marija Antičević; 4 October 1957 (age 68) Zadar, SR Croatia, SFR Yugoslavia (modern Croatia)
- Party: Social Democratic Party (1990–2016)
- Spouse: Marko Marinović
- Children: Dan
- Education: University of Split

Ingrid Antičević-Marinović (born Marija Antičević; on 4 October 1957) is a Croatian lawyer and former politician who serves as justice of the Constitutional Court of Croatia since 7 June 2016. She had previously served as a 9th Minister of Justice, Public Administration and Local Self-government in the center-left Cabinet of Ivica Račan II from 2001 to 2003. She was the first woman to serve as Justice Minister in Croatia as well as first woman lawyer in Zadar's history.

After becoming involved in politics in year 1990 by joining Social Democratic Party of Croatia (SDP), Antičević-Marinović served five consecutive terms as MP, having been elected to the Croatian Parliament in the 2000, 2003, 2007, 2011 and 2015 parliament elections, representing the 9th electoral district.

== Early life and education ==
Ingrid Antičević-Marinović was born as Marija Antičević on 18 July 1958 in Zadar to Pavao and Huanita Antičević. She has two years older brother Zvonimir. She finished elementary and high school in her hometown after which she enrolled in the Faculty of Law of the University of Split from which she graduated in 1980.

At the fourth year of study she became pregnant and married lawyer Marko Marinović. Her husband at first worked as a law clerk in the Yugoslav People's Army, and after that assistant district attorney in Zadar, Secretary of the Secretariat of the Interior of the Zadar municipality and eventually lawyer in a private practice.

She passed the bar exam in 1982, and notary exam in 1994. After passing bar exam, she completed postgraduate studies in Criminal Sciences at the Zagreb School of Law and passed all exams except the final so she never got PhD.

== Career ==
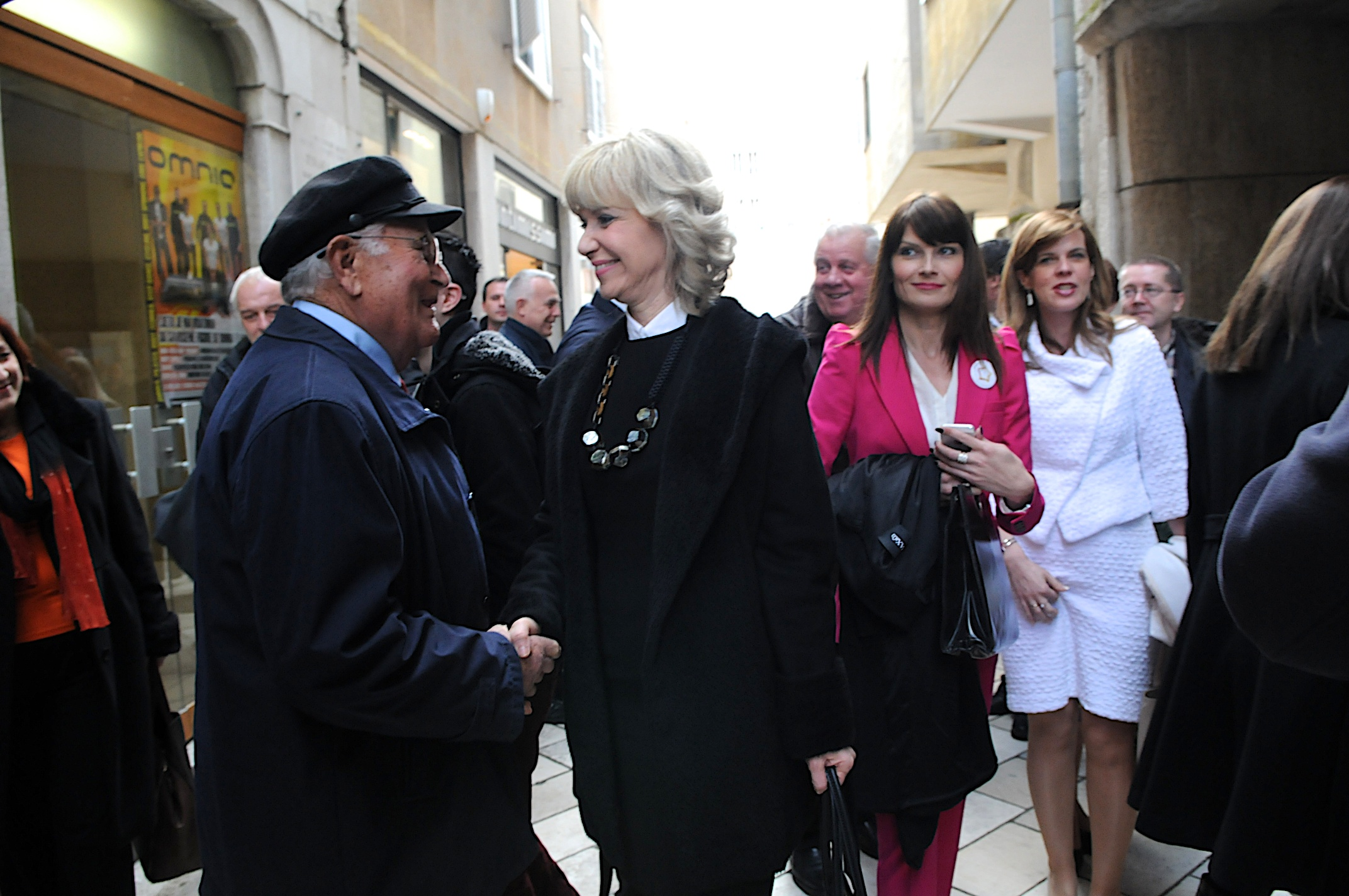
Antičević-Marinović in Zadar, 2013

After graduation, Antičević-Marinović got employed as a lawyer in her husband's office. She was the first woman lawyer in Zadar's history. In the year 1990, she joined center-left Social Democratic Party of Croatia (SDP). She served as SDP member of the City Council of Zadar in several mandates. In 1996, she became member of the SDP's Main Board. She was first elected to the Croatian Parliament in 2000 elections. In the same year, she became a member of the SDP Presidency. In 2001, Antičević-Marinović was appointed Minister of Justice, Public Administration and Local Self-government in the center-left Cabinet of Ivica Račan II. From 2003 until 2005, she served as a Vice-President of SDP. She was re-elected to the Parliament on 2003 elections. In the year 2003, affair connected to her husband broke out which resulted in her withdrawal from the public. Namely, her husband Marko disclosed attorney-client privilege of his client Ana Magaš who was accused of killing her husband. His license was temporally suspended by the Croatian Bar Association as a punishment for negligence. In 2006, another affair broke out when it was discovered that Antičević-Marinović abused her power as a Minister by signing her husband's client consent to take over a gas station in Lužani although its ownership was disputed at the time. She immediately resigned her position as Vice-president of SDP. In the following years, she was re-elected to the Parliament in 2007 and 2011 elections. On June 4, 2016, she was elected Justice of the Constitutional Court of Croatia by the Parliament with 117 votes in favor, 15 against and 6 absent. She took her oath before president Kolinda Grabar-Kitarović on June 7, 2016, by which her first 8-year term as a Justice began.

== Personal life ==
Ingrid Antičević-Marinović is married to lawyer Marko Marinović (b. 1942) with whom she has a son Dan (b. 1980 who is also a lawyer.

== See also ==
- First women lawyers around the world
