= Đurđa Adlešič =

Croatian politician (born 1960)

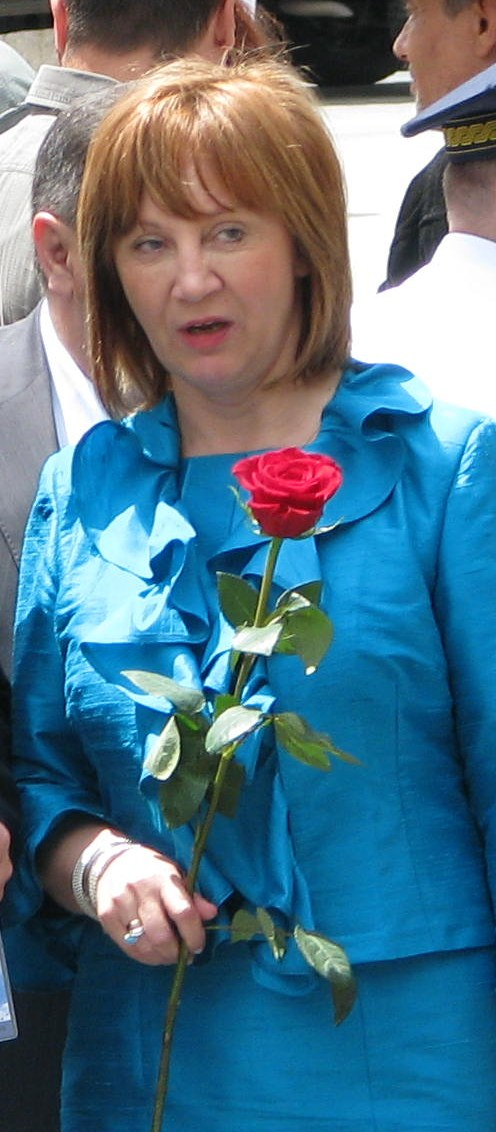

Member of the Croatian Parliament
- In office 22 October 2010 – 22 December 2011

Deputy Prime Minister of Croatia
- In office 12 January 2008 – 12 October 2010
- Prime Minister: Ivo Sanader; Jadranka Kosor
- Preceded by: Position established
- Succeeded by: Gordan Jandroković

Personal details
- Born: 9 August 1960 (age 66) Bjelovar, PR Croatia, FPR Yugoslavia
- Party: Independent (previously HSLS)
- Education: University of Banja Luka

Đurđa Adlešič (also Đurđa Adlešić; born 9 August 1960) is a former Croatian politician and former leader of the center-right Croatian Social Liberal Party (HSLS).

Adlešič entered politics in 1990 and was one of the founders of Croatian Social Liberal Party in her hometown. She became an MP in 1995. In 2000, she won her second term and became the vice-president of the party. In 2001 she became the mayor of Bjelovar. In 2003 she won her third term in the Parliament, and was reelected as mayor in 2005. She served as the president of the Croatian Social Liberal party from 2006 to 2009.

In 2010 Adlešič left the HSLS and retired from politics in 2011.

== Sources ==
- Đurđa Adlešić (in Croatian)

Party political offices
Preceded by Ivan Čehok (as president of HSLS)	President of Croatian Social Liberal Party; 11 February 2006 – 14 November 2009	Succeeded by Darinko Kosor
Preceded by Zlatko Benašić (as president of LS)	President of Croatian Social Liberal Party; 11 February 2006 – 14 November 2009	Succeeded by Darinko Kosor
