= Božidar Kalmeta =

Croatian politician

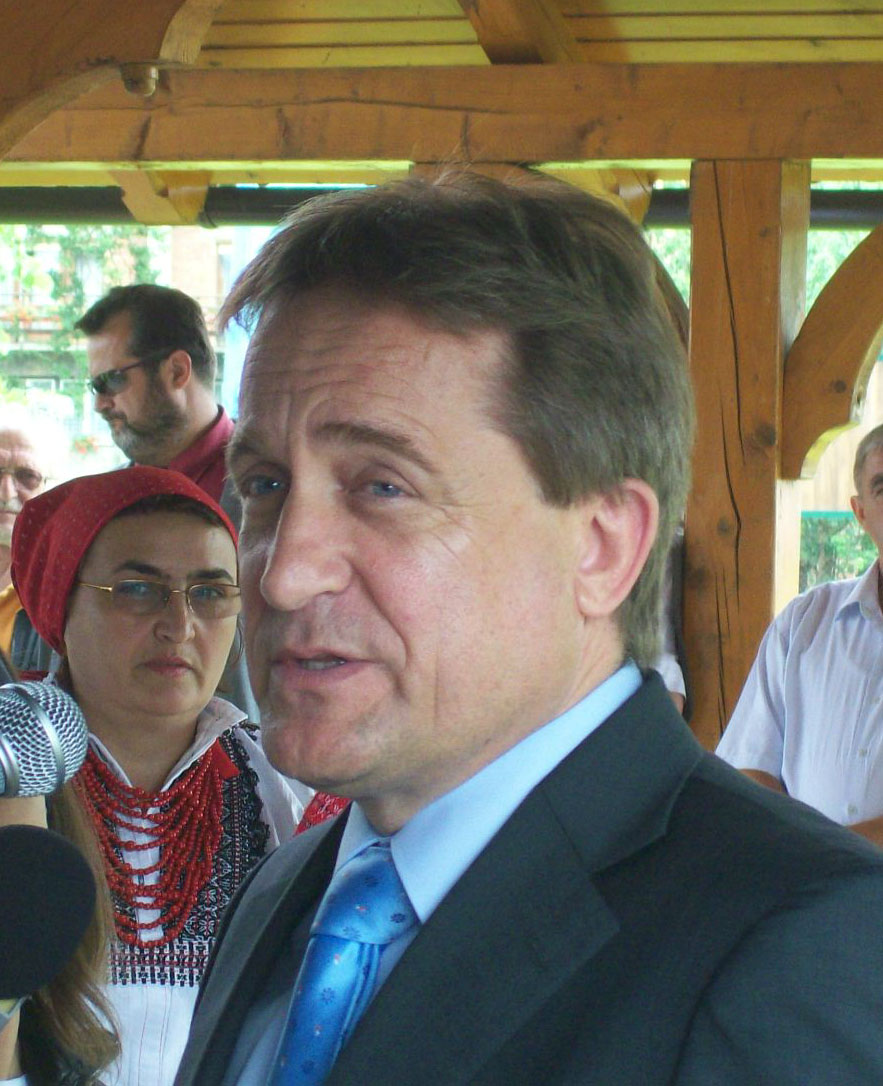

Mayor of Zadar
- In office 7 June 2013 – 21 May 2017
- Preceded by: Zvonimir Vrančić
- Succeeded by: Branko Dukić
- In office 1994–2003
- Preceded by: Duško Kučina
- Succeeded by: Ana Lovrin

Minister of the Sea, Tourism, Transport and Development
- In office 23 December 2003 – 23 December 2011
- Prime Minister: Ivo Sanader; Jadranka Kosor
- Preceded by: Office established
- Succeeded by: Zlatko Komadina

Member of the Croatian Parliament
- In office 1995–2003
- Constituency: IX electoral district

Personal details
- Born: 15 January 1958 (age 68) Zadar, PR Croatia, FPR Yugoslavia
- Party: Croatian Democratic Union
- Spouse: Dolores Kalmeta
- Education: University of Zagreb (Faculty of Agronomy)

Božidar Kalmeta (pronounced [bǒʒidar kâlmeta]; born 15 January 1958) is a Croatian politician and member of the Croatian Democratic Union (HDZ) party. From 2003 to 2011 he served in the Croatian Government as Croatia's Minister of Maritime Affairs, Transport and Infrastructure under HDZ prime ministers Ivo Sanader and Jadranka Kosor.

== Early life ==
Kalmeta graduated in 1982 from the University of Zagreb Faculty of Agronomy.

From 1982 to 1993 he worked in his hometown of Zadar as a technologist and manager at the Maraska distilling company (which produces the world-famous Maraschino liqueur).

== Political career ==
In 1989 he joined the Croatian Democratic Union (HDZ) and in 1993 his full-time political career started after he was elected to the Zadar City Council. In 1994 he became Zadar's deputy mayor, and from 1994 to 2003 he served as mayor of the city.

From 1995 to 2003 he was also a member of the Croatian Parliament, serving as one of representatives from Zadar County. At the 7th HDZ Convention he was elected party's vice-president, beating Ivić Pašalić, and is currently a member of the party's presidency.

After HDZ won the Croatian parliamentary elections of 2003, Kalmeta was appointed to the newly created post of Minister of the Sea, Tourism, Transport and Development (which was created by merging three separate ministries) under Prime Minister Ivo Sanader. One of the chief accomplishments credited to his ministry was the completion of the A1 Highway linking the country's two largest cities, Zagreb and Split. In the next elections of 2007 HDZ won again and Kalmeta kept his post under Ivo Sanader's second term in office.

In February 2009, Kalmeta fired Davorin Kobak, the general manager of Croatian Railways, the national railway operator overseen by Kalmeta's Ministry, allegedly after a police wiretap operation uncovered a conspiracy to embezzle three million euros. In June, USKOK arrested Kobak and two others and charged them with embezzlement. In July and August, after the 2009 Rudine train derailment, Kalmeta intervened to replace several managers, and soon after, HŽ managers Ivan Medak, Drago Rogulj, Drago Ivanković were arrested for their role in causing the fatal Rudine accident, with several others.

In November 2009, Kalmeta's long-time associate the State Secretary Zdravko Livaković unexpectedly resigned and after that the Government fired much of the management of the public company Hrvatske autoceste, the largest recipient of Kalmeta's Ministry budget money. Soon afterwards, three former managers of Hrvatske autoceste, Jurica Prskalo, Mario Lovrinčević and Goran Legac, were arrested for embezzling over 21 million kuna on a public tender, together with a chief engineer Željko Kandžija and owner of a private construction company Slaven Žužul.

Kalmeta has consistently stated he never knew about those affairs and has refused to take any kind of responsibility. President Stjepan Mesić was one of many who suggested Kalmeta needed to resign. After another railway accident on 21 November near Rijeka, the railway workers union sent an open letter of complaint to the minister. On 11 December 2009 Kalmeta underwent an interpellation and survived a vote of no confidence.

In December 2010, Kalmeta dismissed the last remaining member of the Board of Directors of Hrvatske autoceste, Josip Sapunar, after he was indicted for participating in a large-scale embezzlement scheme. The latter subsequently testified in USKOK and accused the minister of complicity. In June 2015 Kalmeta and 12 others were indicted by USKOK for corruption.

== Personal life ==
Kalmeta is married with three children. He speaks English and Italian and his hobbies include spearfishing, jogging and reading.

Political offices
Preceded by Duško Kučina	Mayor of Zadar; 1994–2003	Succeeded by Ana Lovrin
Preceded by Pave Župan-Rusković as Minister of Tourism	Minister of the Sea, Tourism, Transport and Development; 2003–2008	Succeeded by Damir Bajs as Minister of Tourism
Preceded by Roland Žuvanić as Minister of Maritime Affairs, Transport and Communications	Minister of the Sea, Tourism, Transport and Development; 2003–2008	Succeeded by Himself as Minister of the Sea, Transport and Infrastructure
Preceded by Office established	Minister of the Sea, Transport and Infrastructure; 2008–2011	Succeeded by Zlatko Komadina as Minister of Maritime Affairs, Transport and Infrastructure
