= Gordan Jandroković =

Croatian diplomat and politician (born 1967)

- Jandroković in 2026

Speaker of the Croatian Parliament
- Incumbent
- Assumed office 5 May 2017
- Preceded by: Božo Petrov

Deputy Prime Minister of Croatia
- In office 29 December 2010 – 23 December 2011
- Prime Minister: Jadranka Kosor
- Preceded by: Đurđa Adlešič
- Succeeded by: Milanka Opačić

Minister of Foreign and European Affairs
- In office 13 January 2008 – 23 December 2011
- Prime Minister: Ivo Sanader; Jadranka Kosor
- Preceded by: Kolinda Grabar-Kitarović
- Succeeded by: Vesna Pusić

Member of the Croatian Parliament
- In office 22 December 2003 – 22 July 2020
- Constituency: II electoral district (2003–2011); I electoral district (2011–2015, 2016–2020); VI electoral district (2015–2016)

Personal details
- Born: 2 August 1967 (age 59) Bjelovar, SR Croatia, SFR Yugoslavia (modern Croatia)
- Party: Croatian Democratic Union
- Spouse: Sonja Matasić (m. 1994)
- Children: 3
- Education: University of Zagreb

Gordan Jandroković (born 2 August 1967) is a Croatian diplomat and politician who has been the Speaker of the Croatian Parliament since 2017, and is the only speaker to have served more than one term. Prior to his tenure as speaker he was a member of parliament from 2003 to 2020, and Deputy Prime Minister of Croatia from 2010 to 2011. He is a member of the Croatian Democratic Union and is a member of its presidency.

== Early life and education ==
Gordan Jandroković was born in Bjelovar, Socialist Republic of Croatia, Yugoslavia, on 2 August 1967. He was educated in civil engineering at the University of Zagreb from 1986 to 1991, graduated with a bachelor's degree in political science at the University of Zagreb after attending from 1989 to 1993, and the Diplomatic Academy of the Ministry of Foreign and European Affairs from 1996 to 1997.

== Career ==
From 1989 to 1994, Jandroković worked at a construction company. He joined the Ministry of Foreign and European Affairs in 1994, and was appointed Minister of Foreign and European Affairs in 2008.

Jandroković joined the Croatian Democratic Union in 1992, and became a member of its presidency in 2004.

In the 2003 election Jandroković won a seat in the Croatian Parliament. During his tenure in parliament he served as vice-chair of the European Affairs committee and chair of the Foreign Policy and Economy, Development and Reconstruction committees.

From 2010 to 2011, Jandroković was Deputy Prime Minister of Croatia. Jandroković served as deputy speaker from 2016 to 2017. On 5 May 2017, he was elected Speaker by a vote of 76 to 13. He was the first speaker to be reelected to a second term.

== Personal life ==
Jandroković married Sonja Jandroković, with whom he had three children. He can speak English and Italian.

== Works cited ==
=== News ===
- "Jandroković izabran za predsjednika sabora. Stigli novi zastupnici Puljak, Krišto..." Index.hr. 22 July 2020. Archived from the original on 2 July 2025.

=== Web ===
- "Gordan Jandroković" (PDF). Croatian Parliament. Archived (PDF) from the original on 20 June 2025.
- "Gordan Jandrokovic". Government of Croatia. Archived from the original on 25 February 2009.
- "Za novog predsjednika Sabora izabran Gordan Jandroković". Croatian Parliament. 5 May 2017. Archived from the original on 11 July 2019.

Political offices
Preceded by Božo Petrov	Speaker of the Croatian Parliament; 2017–present	Incumbent
