= Damir Bajs =

Croatian politician (born 1964)

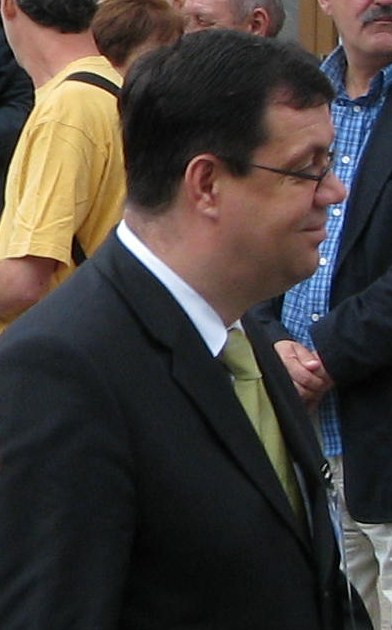
Damir Bajs

Damir Bajs (born 7 October 1964 in Pakrac, Yugoslavia) is a Croatian politician and former Croatian Minister of Tourism.

He is currently serving as a member of Parliament and formerly served as the Prefect of Bjelovar-Bilogora County. He is a member of the Focus political party.

Political offices
Preceded by	Župan of Bjelovar–Bilogora County; 2000–2008	Succeeded by Miroslav Čačija
Preceded by Božidar Kalmeta	Minister of Tourism; 2008–2011	Succeeded by Veljko Ostojić
