= Damir Polančec =

Croatian politician (born 1967)

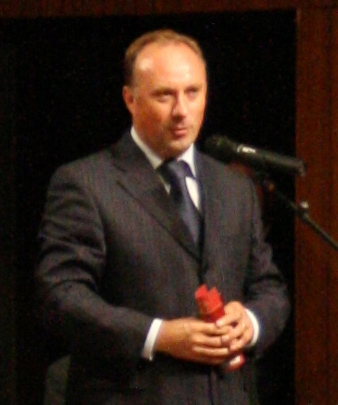

Minister of Economy, Labour and Entrepreneurship
- In office 12 January 2008 – 30 October 2009
- Prime Minister: Ivo Sanader; Jadranka Kosor
- Preceded by: Branko Vukelić
- Succeeded by: Đuro Popijač

Deputy Prime Minister of Croatia
- In office 17 February 2005 – 30 October 2009
- Prime Minister: Ivo Sanader; Jadranka Kosor
- Preceded by: Andrija Hebrang
- Succeeded by: Ivan Šuker

Personal details
- Born: 25 June 1967 (age 59) Koprivnica, SR Croatia, SFR Yugoslavia
- Party: Croatian Democratic Union
- Education: University of Zagreb (Faculty of Agronomy)
- Occupation: Politician

Damir Polančec (born 25 June 1967) is a Croatian politician who served as Minister of Economy, Labour and Entrepreneurship from 2008 to 2009, and as Deputy Prime Minister of Croatia from 2005 to 2009, in the cabinets of two prime ministers, Ivo Sanader and Jadranka Kosor.

On 30 October 2009, Polančec resigned citing a need to avoid damaging the Government and the party due to accusations leveled at him for his involvement in the mismanagement of Podravka.

On 30 March 2010, Polančec was apprehended by the police and questioned by USKOK, regarding his involvement in certain financial transactions between Podravka, MOL Group and OTP Bank. The County Court in Zagreb authorized a longer detention for Polančec and also blocked his estates, at the request of USKOK.

On 15 October 2010, Polančec was sentenced to 15 months in prison for a separate instance of abuse of power, where he approved a fictional expense to a Vukovar-based attorney in return for his clients dropping lawsuits against the government.
