= Ivo Sanader =

Croatian politician (born 1953)

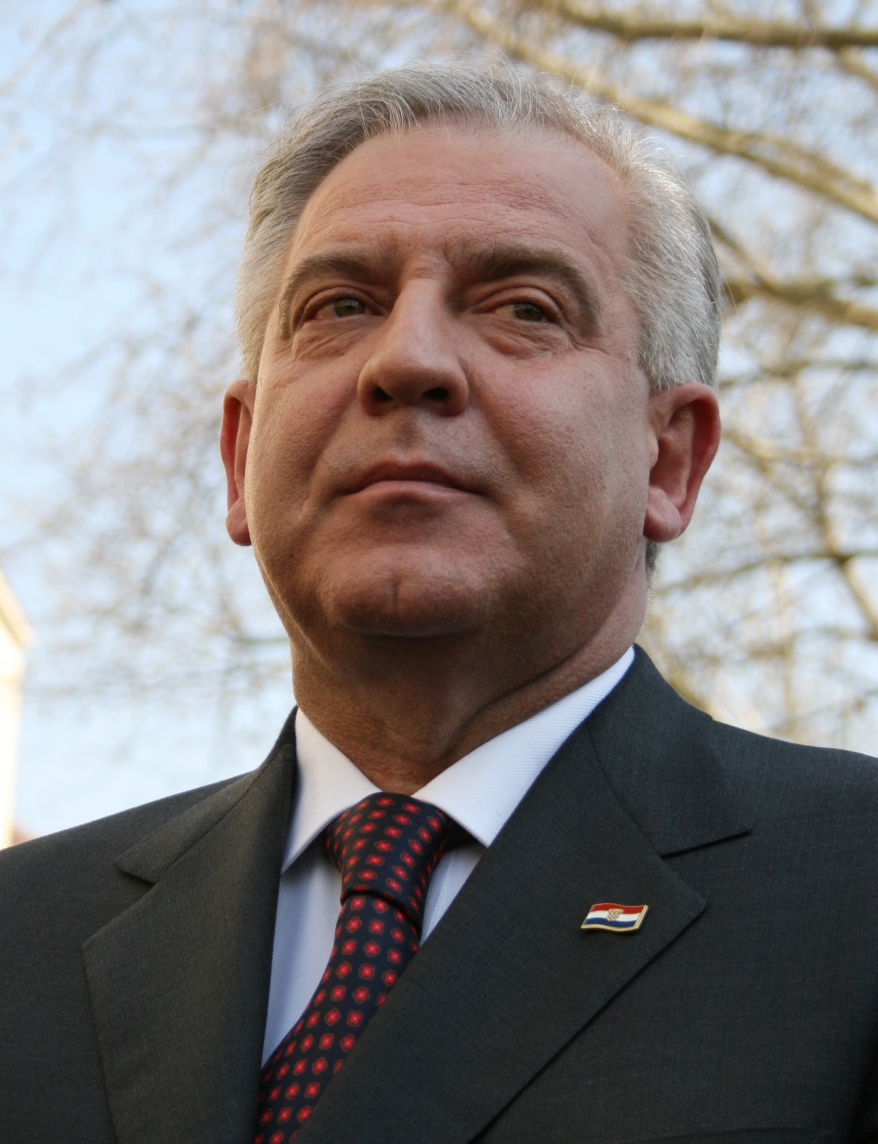
- Sanader in 2009

Prime Minister of Croatia
- In office 23 December 2003 – 6 July 2009
- President: Stjepan Mesić
- Preceded by: Ivica Račan
- Succeeded by: Jadranka Kosor

Minister of Science and Technology
- In office 12 August 1992 – 7 January 1993
- Preceded by: Jure Radić
- Succeeded by: Branko Jeren
Further offices held
Leader of the Opposition
In office 30 April 2000 – 23 December 2003
Preceded by	Ivica Račan; Vladimir Šeks (Acting)
Succeeded by	Ivica Račan
President of the Croatian Democratic Union
In office 30 April 2000 – 4 July 2009
Preceded by	Franjo Tuđman; Vladimir Šeks (Acting)
Succeeded by	Jadranka Kosor
Member of the Croatian Parliament for 10th electoral district
In office 13 October 2010 – 22 December 2011
In office 2 February 2000 – 22 December 2003
Chief of Staff of the Office of the President of Croatia
In office 24 November 1995 – 5 November 1996
President	Franjo Tuđman
Preceded by	Hrvoje Šarinić
Succeeded by	Hrvoje Šarinić

Personal details
- Born: 8 June 1953 (age 73) Split, PR Croatia, FPR Yugoslavia (modern Croatia)
- Party: Croatian Democratic Union (1989–2010)
- Spouse: Mirjana Šarić (m. 1978)
- Children: 2
- Education: University of Innsbruck
- Occupation: Writer; historian; politician

Ivo Sanader (Croatian pronunciation: [ǐːʋo sanǎːder]; born 8 June 1953) is a Croatian former politician who served as Prime Minister of Croatia from 2003 to 2009. He was president of the Croatian Democratic Union (HDZ) from 2000 to 2009.

Sanader is to date the second longest-serving prime minister since Croatia's independence, holding the office for over five and a half years before resigning in July 2009. He is one of only two Croatian prime ministers (along with Andrej Plenković) who have served more than one term, winning the general elections in 2003 and 2007. He is also, along with Ivica Račan and Plenković, one of the three prime ministers who have been at the head of more than one government cabinet, chairing his first cabinet from 23 December 2003 until 12 January 2008, and his second cabinet from 12 January 2008 until his resignation on 6 July 2009.

Sanader obtained his education in comparative literature in Austria, where he also worked as a journalist, in marketing, publishing, and as an entrepreneur. In the 1990s, he was briefly the intendant of the Croatian National Theatre in Split before becoming Minister for Science and Technology as a member of the ruling Croatian Democratic Union in the cabinet of Hrvoje Šarinić in 1992. In 1993, he moved into diplomacy and served two terms as Deputy Minister for Foreign Affairs.

Following the death of Franjo Tuđman, Sanader was elected president of the HDZ in 2000, and again in 2002, and led the party to victory in the 2003, and 2007 elections, becoming Croatia's Prime Minister. In June 2009, he abruptly resigned his post, leaving scarce explanation for his actions and disappearing from public life for a while. In January 2010, he tried to stage a political comeback within the HDZ, but was ejected from party membership.

In December 2010, Croatian authorities indicted Sanader in two high-profile corruption cases. He fled the country but was apprehended in Austria and extradited to Croatia in July 2011. In November 2012, he was sentenced to 10 years in prison in a first instance verdict, later reduced to 8 1/2 years, for funneling 10.4 million euros in public money to the Fimi Media company. However, his sentence was annulled by Croatia's Constitutional Court in 2015. With the exception of numerous Croatian officials who were sentenced to imprisonment during the existence of the socialist Yugoslavia, he is the first Croatian head of government and highest ranking state official to be tried and sentenced to a jail term. In October 2018, Sanader was sentenced to two and a half years in prison for war profiteering and ordered to return $570,000 in kickbacks from Hypo Bank. In November 2020, he was sentenced to eight years in jail for his role in a retrial of the Fimi Media case. Some Croatian journalists evaluate Sanader's leadership of Croatia as a "kleptocratic-clientelistic era".

== Early life ==
Sanader was born in Split to a poor, religious, working-class family originating from Dugobabe, a village in the Split hinterland. He was one of five children so, as his family was financially unable to support their education, his mother asked the rector of the Archbishopric Classical Gymnasium to accept Ivo as a student. At the gymnasium, Sanader distinguished himself as one of the top students, excelling in history and languages. After completing high school, Sanader spent one year in Rome studying philosophy. Following his return from Rome he met Mirjana Šarić, whom he married in 1978.

After their wedding, Ivo and Mirjana, and Ivo's younger brother Miro left Split for Innsbruck, Austria. His wife studied archaeology, while Ivo studied comparative literature and Romance languages at the University of Innsbruck. During that time, Sanader worked as a correspondent for the Zagreb sport newspaper Sportske novosti.

In 1982, Sanader received his PhD degree, and returned to Croatia (then Yugoslavia) with his wife. He found a job in the marketing department of Dalmacijaturist (Dalmatia Tourist), for a brief period, followed by a lengthy period at the publishing house Logos from 1983, initially as a program editor. In 1988 he became a chief editor, at one time working on the magazine Mogućnosti (Possibilities). His career at the publishing house was later terminated. At that time, his wife also received a notice of termination from her workplace.

In 1987, Sanader decided to return to Austria with his family, where he co-founded two businesses, one in 1989 which was liquidated by a court in 1992, while the other existed between 1986 and 2001. Failure of his businesses prompted Sanader to enter politics in the 1990s.

Apart from his native Croatian, he is fluent in English, German, French, and Italian.

== Political career ==
=== Beginnings (1990s–2000) ===
Unlike many Croatian political figures of Sanader's generation, he was not actively involved in politics in his younger years – neither as a member of the League of Communists of Croatia (Croatia's party which formed the single bloc which governed Yugoslavia), nor as a dissident in exile.

In October 1990, after multi-party system had returned to Yugoslavia, he founded the Tirol branch of the Croatian Democratic Union (HDZ) in Austria, and established contact with Franjo Tuđman. Sanader's organizational skills, erudition, and fluency in German left a favorable impression on HDZ members with whom he collaborated in Austria. He decided to return to Split, over the objections of his wife who saw war in Croatia looming. His first public office was intendant of the Croatian National Theatre in Split. Shortly after taking the office, he was joined by his wife, who got a job in the University Library in Split.

In 1992 he was elected as an HDZ deputy to the lower house of the Croatian parliament, and became Minister of Science and Technology (1992–1993). From 1993 to 1995 and 1996 to 2000, he was a Deputy Minister for Foreign Affairs, overseeing the termination of required visas for Croatian citizens who traveled to Greece. He also used his negotiation skills to bring people to the Croatian Democratic Union from other Croatian parliamentary parties.

At the end of November 1995, he became Chief of Staff of the President of Croatia's office and General Secretary of the Croatian National Security and Defense Council (VONS) after Hrvoje Šarinić and Goran Drozdek were released from their duties. In January 1996 he became a member of the Council for Cooperation between Croatia and the Republic of Bosnia and Herzegovina.

During his second term as Deputy Minister for Foreign Affairs he worked to bring Croatia and Israel together. Himself, Hrvoje Šarinić and Eytan Bentsur, Vice Minister for Foreign Affairs in the Israeli government, met in Budapest in 1997, at which point diplomatic relations between Croatia and Israel were established.

=== Leader of Opposition (2000–2003) ===
In 2000, following Tuđman's death, HDZ suffered defeat in a parliamentary election. Furthermore, their candidate Mate Granić also failed to enter the second round of the presidential election. Granić then left to form the Democratic Centre party hoping to attract moderates from the HDZ. Inner-party election within the HDZ ensued in April that year and Sanader emerged victorious as a compromise candidate.

Initially, Sanader criticized the unpopular International Criminal Tribunal for the former Yugoslavia (ICTY) indictments against Croatian Army generals. In 2001, he took part in a massive rally protesting a war crimes indictment against general Mirko Norac. Sanader also criticised Ivica Račan and his cabinet's stance towards the ICTY. He gradually began to distance the party and himself from the protests, softening his criticism towards the government.

Sanader focused his efforts on transforming the HDZ into a modern pro-European right-of-center party. However, his course was challenged by the more conservative wing of the party led by Ivić Pašalić. The ensuing leadership struggle culminated at the 2002 party convention. Sanader, who was supported by Vladimir Šeks and convicted war criminal Branimir Glavaš, managed to win his second mandate. Pašalić left the party to form his Croatian Bloc, but failed to draw many of his former supporters from the HDZ.

Sanader was later accused by Ivan Drmić, a former member of the Croatian Democratic Union, for rigging the presidential election at the 5th convention of the Croatian Democratic Union. Spokesman for the Croatian Democratic Union Ratko Maček said such accusations "belong in the anthology of political stupidity."

Sanader was able to concentrate on defeating Ivica Račan and his left-of-centre coalition at the 2003 parliamentary elections. HDZ won the election, but did not win an absolute majority in Sabor.

=== Premiership (2003–2009) ===
==== First term (2003–2008) ====
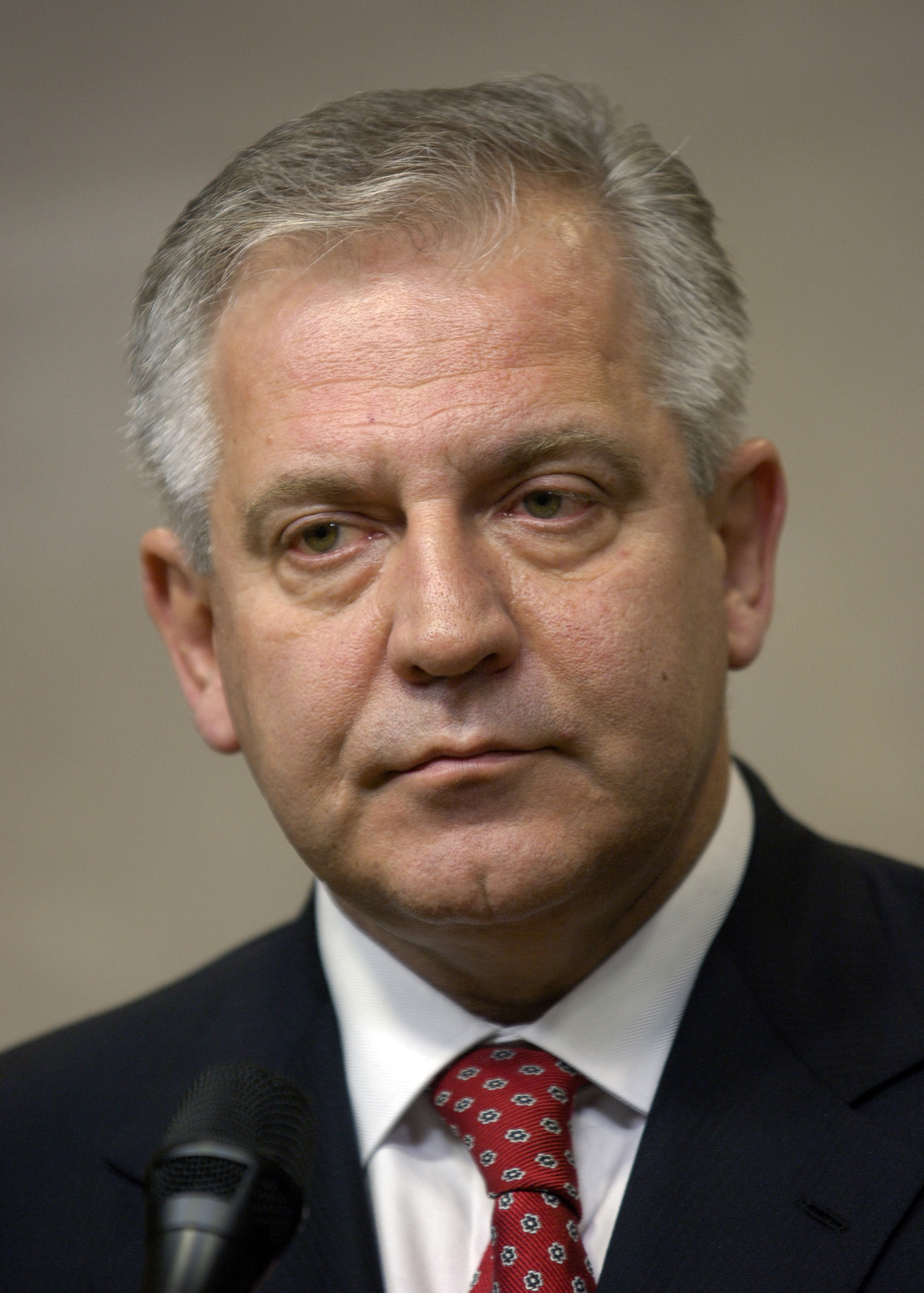
Sanader in 2005

After the victory of his Croatian Democratic Union (HDZ) the President of the Republic named Sanader the Prime Minister-designate on 9 December 2003. In the post-election negotiations Sanader ensured the support of ethnic minority representatives, nominally left-wing Croatian Party of Pensioners and the Independent Democratic Serb Party. When the Croatian Parliament subsequently gave its consent by 88 votes (out of 152) on 23 December 2003, Sanader was formally appointed.

The Sanader government's main foreign goal was Croatia's entry into the European Union and NATO. As a result of the successful implementation of the Association Agreement – signed with the European Union in 2001 – Croatia did become an official candidate for entry into the EU. Sanader's HDZ also sought to establish better relations with minority parties and to promote minority rights. Amongst other factors contributing to the positive opinion of the European Commission and the European Council regarding Croatia's bid to become an EU member were Croatia's cooperation with the ICTY, continued economic growth and the country's compliance with political and economic criteria established by the 1993 Copenhagen European Council.

Sanader was the last statesman to visit Pope John Paul II in Vatican City, in February 2005, a few weeks before his death on 2 April 2005.

In October 2005, following the formal start of EU accession negotiations, opinion polls showed Sanader to be the most popular Croatian politician.

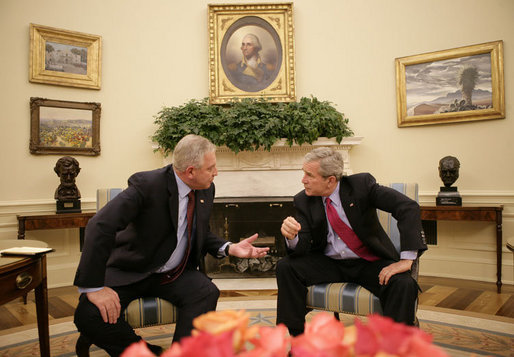
Sanader in a meeting with U.S. President George W. Bush at the White House, 17 October 2006

Škare Ožbolt reported that Sanader possessed a collection of wrist watches worth in excess of €150,000 which he had not declared as assets. Former Minister of Justice Vesna Škare-Ožbolt in the Sanader government was the one who reported Sanader to a resolution council for conflict of interests.

As Prime Minister, Sanader had close relations with other moderate conservative politicians in Europe: including former Austrian Chancellor Wolfgang Schüssel, former Bavarian Prime Minister Edmund Stoiber, Chancellor of Germany Angela Merkel, and Irish prime minister Bertie Ahern. The cabinet saw some changes during Sanader's term, notably the departure of the foreign minister Miomir Žužul who was accused of conflict of interest. His government was challenged by the rising tide of Euroscepticism in the country.

In July 2006, Sanader was named in the "Verona Affair", accused by the opposition in the Croatian parliament for fixing the sale of pharmaceutical company Pliva to Barr Pharmaceuticals from the US. The accusations were denied and never proved.

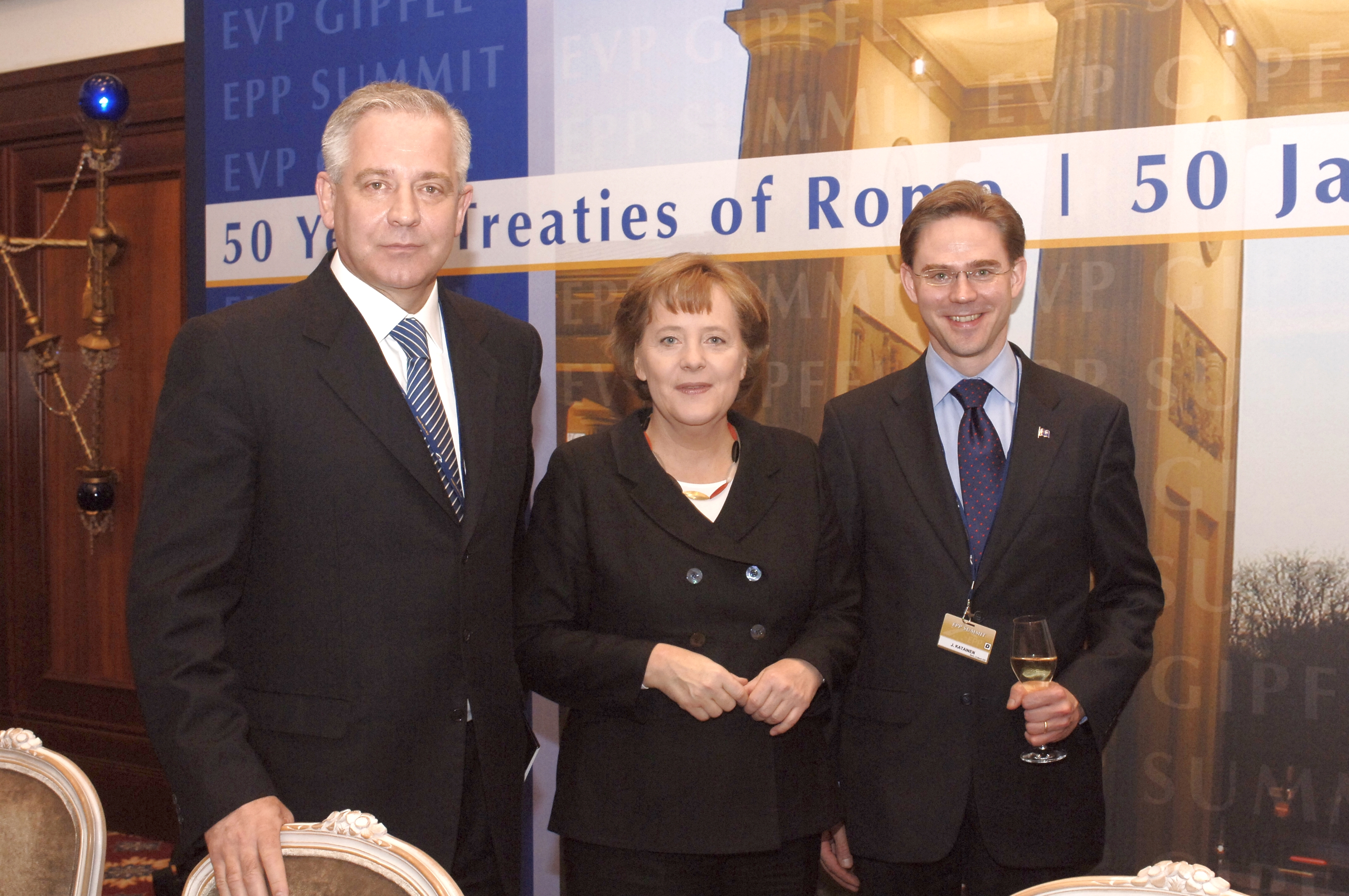
Sanader with Angela Merkel and Jyrki Katainen, at an EPP summit in 24 March 2007

Nacional, an independent political weekly, reported Sanader was a part of two bankrupt businesses in Austria, and received bribes in 1995 and 1996 from a tycoon amounting to 800,000 DEM.

==== Second term (2008–2009) ====
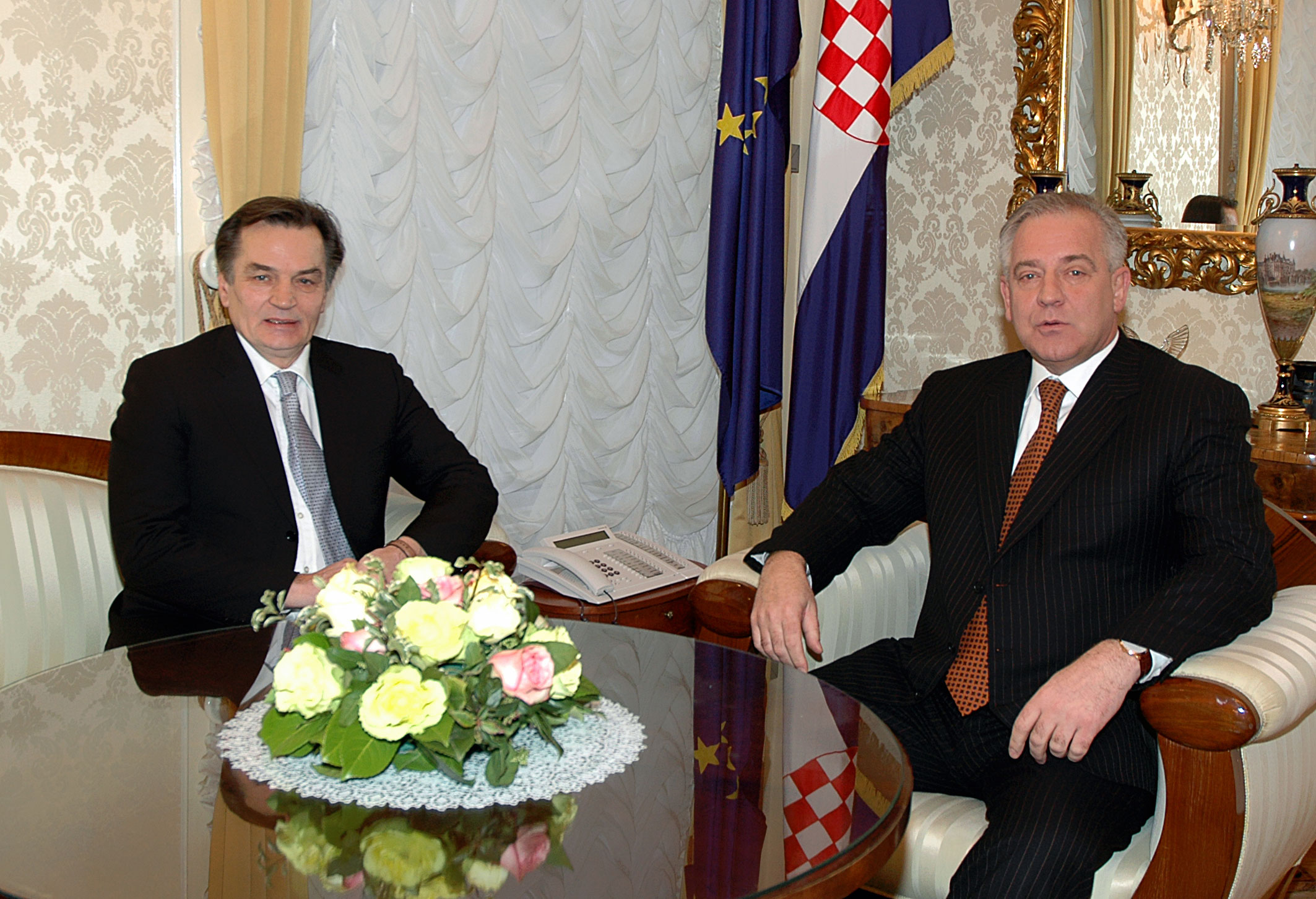
Sanader with Bosnian Presidency member Haris Silajdžić, 22 January 2009

After the closely contested 2007 parliamentary election, and the first ever situation of ambiguity on who gets the mandate to form a government, Sanader emerged as the winner when President Stjepan Mesić gave him his second mandate, though this time in a coalition with the HSS and the HSLS.

Owing in part to the global recession that set in during Sanader's term, Croatia's economic growth stalled and foreign direct investments slowed down. While displaying symptoms of economic decline shared by larger nations, Croatia's decline during Sanader's term was amplified in comparison with the fortunes of Serbia and next door Montenegro – who gained greater investments due to major reforms. Under Sanader, judicial reforms in Croatia stopped and the land registry issue was not resolved. Over 1.3 million court cases (in a country of 4.1 million people) were yet to be resolved in 2009.

Croatia was expected to complete negotiations with the EU in 2009. However, the negotiations were stalled for 10 months due to Slovenia's blockade of Croatia's EU accession in December 2008. On 1 July 2009, Sanader announced his resignation as the Prime Minister and Leader of the HDZ, as well as his complete withdrawal from all active politics, adding that he does not intend to return. At his press conference in Zagreb, Sanader remarked: "There is always a time in life for a new beginning. Such a moment has come and now it is time for others to take over." According to BBC News, the announcement "came as a surprise", as Croatian media had quite recently named Sanader as a potential candidate for the 2010 presidential election. He announced that his prime minister-designate would be deputy Prime Minister Jadranka Kosor.

The Croatian Parliament accepted his resignation on 2 July 2009 and informed the President. Sanader was elected Honorary President of the HDZ for life.

=== Departure and return to politics (2009–2010) ===
At the September 2009 Global Creative Economic Summit, Sanader discussed Croatia's shift from a heavily controlled economy to a bustling "knowledge-based" economy. According to Sanader, fostering the "competitiveness in everyday life" played an important role in this process.

On 3 January 2010, contrary to his earlier statements (1 July 2009), Sanader announced he would be returning to a more active role in politics, stating that his decision to withdraw was a mistake, and that the HDZ is a "winning party and not a party that wins 12% of the vote", a remark made in connection with the first round of the presidential election held one week before. He was supported by a dozen HDZ MPs, including Luka Bebić, but none of the members of the Government. Several of those MPs later disclaimed any association with Sanader and claimed they were misled.

On 4 January 2010, following an entire day of meetings of HDZ leadership, Ivo Sanader was expelled from the Croatian Democratic Union. Of 22 members of the party presidency, 16 voted for expulsion, three were against (Luka Bebić, Mario Zubović and Damir Polančec) and two abstained (Bianca Matković and Petar Selem). Sanader himself was not present at the meeting.

In October 2010, Sanader reactivated his parliamentary seat and regained parliamentary immunity.

=== Arrest in Austria ===
On 9 December 2010, he was spotted crossing the border into Slovenia, driven by his younger daughter Bruna shortly before the Croatian parliament voted to remove his immunity from prosecution by the Croatian Bureau for Combating Corruption and Organized Crime (USKOK). The next day the Croatian police issued an arrest warrant and applied to Interpol requesting his arrest to face charges of corruption. He was arrested near Salzburg, Austria on 10 December 2010. Croatian authorities froze his assets and bank accounts, and formally applied for extradition on 13 December.

Austrian authorities, including a Carinthian parliamentary committee inquiring into the more recent Hypo Alpe-Adria-Bank International scandal, have questioned Sanader while in custody, while USKOK expanded its investigation of Sanader to include alleged bribes by the Hypo Bank in the 1990s.

Sanader is alleged to have received nearly $695,000 (£432,000) for arranging a loan from the Austrian Hypo Bank in 1995, launching accusations of war profiteering, and of receiving 10 million euros in bribes from the CEO of the Hungarian oil company MOL, Zsolt Hernádi, to secure MOL a dominant position in the Croatian oil company INA.

=== Extradition, trials and imprisonment (2011–2025) ===
Sanader was extradited by Austria on 18 July 2011. He was transferred to Remetinec prison in Zagreb.

At his first court hearing on 28 October, he complained of heart problems, and he stated that he did not even know he was being taken to court. After hearing this, the judge decided to reschedule, and Sanader was taken to the hospital. His rescheduled court hearing took place in December 2011 and he was released on bail of $2.2 million on 16 December 2011. In January 2012, it was announced that Sanader was facing a new set of corruption charges. USKOK included Sanader in its investigation into Croatia's state-owned electric company HEP's financial irregularities, including losses of $100 million, based on a witness statement that Sanader accepted a bribe to ensure lower electricity prices.

In May 2012, it was announced that Sanader could be indicted again on corruption offences. It was alleged that he could be charged for his involvement in arranging the sale of electricity to Croatian petrochemical company Dioki Group at prices below market, which damaged the state electricity company HEP by several million Kunas. The former CEO and owner of Dioki, Ivan Mravak and Robert Jezic could also face charges.

In September 2012, A fifth indictment was filed against Ivo Sanader for damaging the state budget by 26 million kuna (3.6 million euro). Prosecutors claimed that the damage was done by selling a building built by Fiolic's firm to the Ministry of Regional Development for more than twice the price that the building was actually worth.

According to calculations of Croatian news site Politika Plus from 2012, total damage done to the budget due to corruption scandals involving Sanader counts at least 207 million kuna. He was indicted five times in total; in Fimi Media, Planinska, INA-MOL, Hypo and HEP cases.

On 20 November 2012, Sanader was sentenced to 10 years in prison in a first-degree verdict for Hypo and INA-MOL cases. He was the highest official in Croatia to be convicted of corruption. Sanader denied wrongdoing and stated that his trial was politically motivated. The judge, Ivan Turudić, said that Sanader had disgraced Croatia, adding that he had used his office for his own personal enrichment and not for the common good. Sanader was transferred from the court to the Remetinec prison.

In June 2014, the Supreme Court of Croatia confirmed the 2012 verdict, but reduced Sanader's prison sentence to 8 1/2 years. On that occasion, president Ivo Josipović described Sanader's involvement in MOL's acquisition of INA as "high treason". In 2015, the verdict was quashed by the Constitutional Court based on procedural errors made during the trial. After spending nearly 5 years both in custody and prison, he was released and set to stand a retrial.

In 2017, he was sentenced to 4 1/2 years in Planinska case. In April 2019, this conviction was confirmed by Supreme Court and sentence raised to 6 years. Since then, Sanader has been incarcerated.

In 2020, he was convicted and sentenced to an additional sentence of 8 years in prison as the result of retrial in the Fimi Media case. That same year, he was convicted and sentenced to an additional sentence of 6 years in prison for the INA-MOL case. Both of these verdicts were confirmed by the Supreme Court in 2021, with the sentence in the Fimi Media case having been reduced to 7 years. His acquittal in the HEP case was confirmed that same year.

In 2022, he was acquitted in Hypo case, and in 2025 the High Criminal Court upheld the verdict after rejecting the appeal of the State Attorney's Office.

In 2023, his sentences stemming from the three convictions (INA-MOL, Planinska, Fimi Media) were merged into one single sentence totaling 18 years and 8 months, and later reduced to 18 years by the Supreme Court. Sanader first served his sentence at the Remetinec prison from 2012 to 2023, after which he was transferred to the Lipovica penitentiary where he remained until 2025. In August 2025, the Sisak County Court ruled he was eligible for early release from prison; he was subsequently released on 31 July at the age of 72.

== Honors ==
Award or decoration	Country	Awarded by	Date	Place
Honorary Colonel of Armed Forces of Croatia	Croatia	Franjo Tuđman	1993	Zagreb
Bavarian Order of Merit	Germany	Edmund Stoiber	2007	Munich

=== Revoked ===
On 15 July 2014, President Ivo Josipović revoked all of Sanader's national decorations following the final judgment by the Supreme Court by which he was sentenced to imprisonment for a term of 8 years and 6 months due to his corruption while he served as Prime Minister.

- Grand Order of Queen Jelena
- Order of Duke Trpimir
- Order of Ante Starčević
- Order of Danica Hrvatska with the face of Marko Marulić
- Order of the Croatian Trefoil
- Homeland's Gratitude Medal

== See also ==
- Cabinet of Ivo Sanader I
- Cabinet of Ivo Sanader II

== Bibliography ==
- Radoš, Ivica (2015). Uspon i pad Sanadera (PDF) (in Croatian). Večernji list. Archived from the original (PDF) on 13 January 2022.

Political offices
Preceded by Jure Radić	Minister of Science and Technology; 1992–1993	Succeeded by Branko Jeren
Preceded by Ivica Račan	Prime Minister of Croatia; 2003–2009	Succeeded by Jadranka Kosor
Party political offices
Preceded by Vladimir Šeks; Acting	President of the Croatian Democratic Union; 2000–2009	Succeeded by Jadranka Kosor
