= List of people from Karlovac County =

The following is a list of notable people from Karlovac, Croatia, and the geographical area of present-day Karlovac County.

== Artists, musicians and actors ==
- Zrinka Cvitešić (born 1979), theater, film and television actress
- Darko Domijan (born 1952), pop singer
- Zvonimír Eichler (1903–1975), painter
- Vjekoslav Karas (1821–1858), 19th-century painter
- Tomislav Krizman (1882–1955), painter, graphic artist, costume and set designer
- Alfred Krupa Sr. (1915–1989), Silesia-born painter, inventor and sportsman
- Alfred Freddy Krupa (born 1971), painter
- John Malkovich (born 1953), actor whose paternal grandparents were from Ozalj
- Carla Martinis (1922–2010), soprano
- Boris Mutić (1939–2009), sports journalist and television commentator
- Vladimir Pogačić (1919–1999), film director
- Barbara Radulović (born 1982), TV host
- Slava Raškaj (1877–1906), painter
- Božidar Širola (1889–1956), composer, musicologist
- Dejan Šorak (born 1954), film director
- Miroslav Šutej (1936–2005), designer
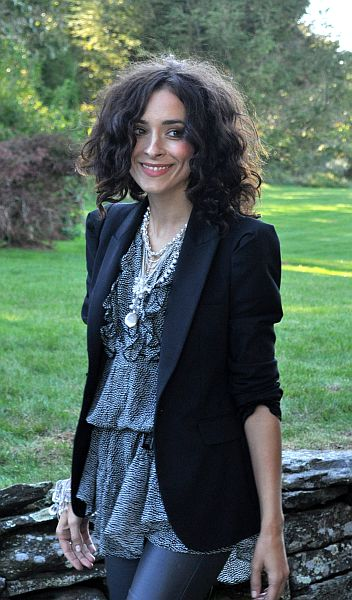
Cvitešić

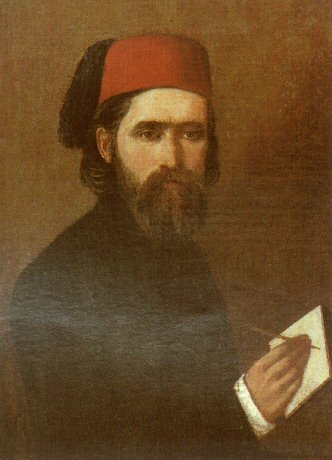
Karas

== Authors ==
- Ivana Brlić-Mažuranić (1874–1938), writer
- Ulderiko Donadini (1894–1923), novelist, dramatist, short story writer
- Karl Felix Wolff (1879–1966), journalist, poet, author and self-taught folklorist
- Dragojla Jarnević (1812–1874), writer and poet
- Juraj Križanić (1618–1683), writer, earliest recorded pan-slavist
- Irena Lukšić (1953–2019), writer and translator
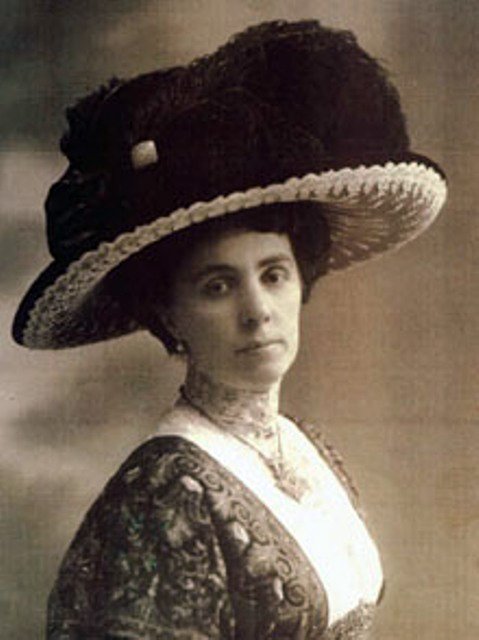
Brlić-Mažuranić

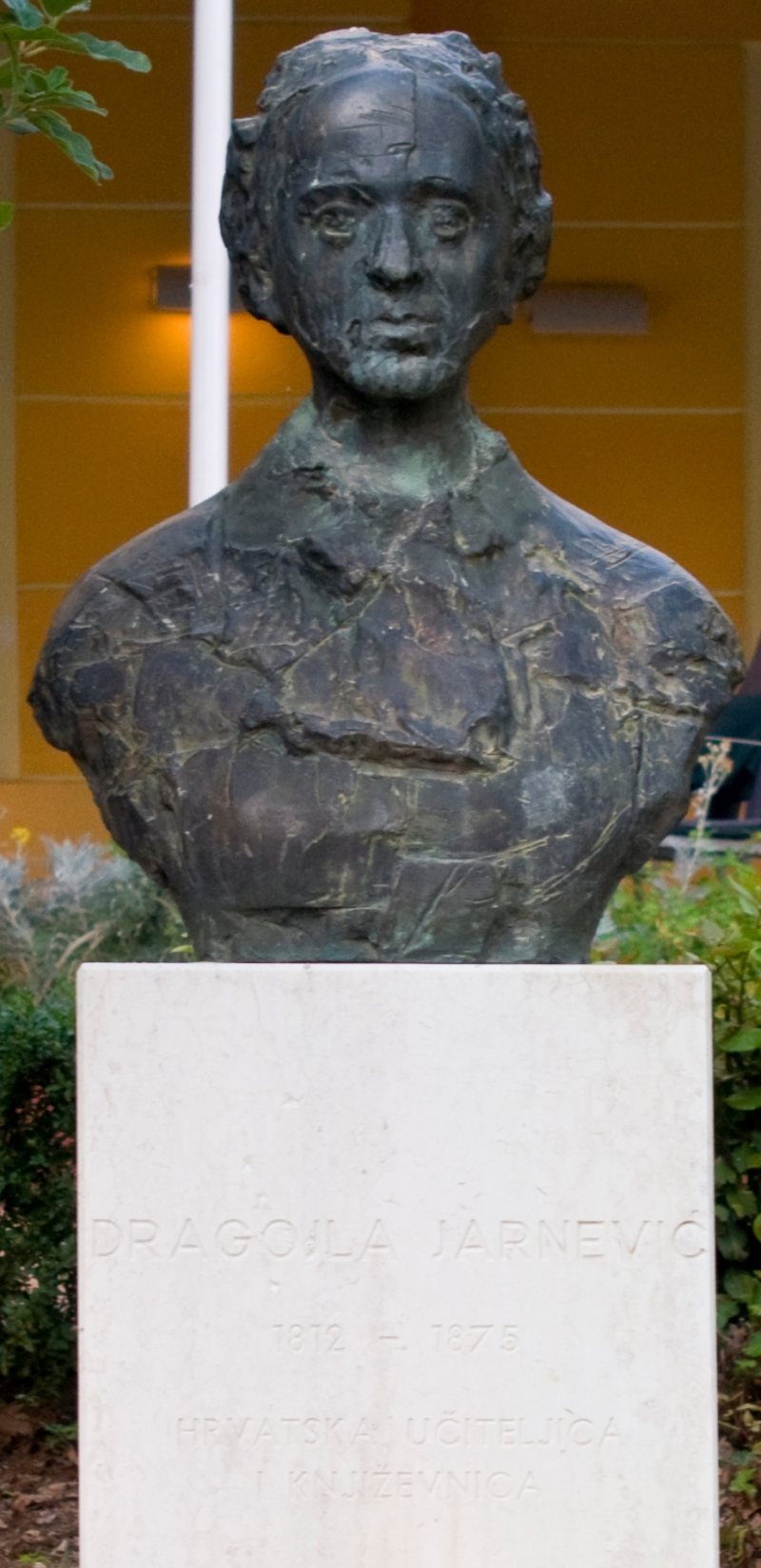
Jarnević

== Military leaders ==
- Edgar Angeli (1892–1945), rear admiral
- Anton Csorich (1795–1864), nobleman and general
- Ivan Gošnjak (1909–1980), general, secretary of defence of Yugoslavia
- Roza Miletić (born 1934), veteran of Croatian war of Independence
- Pavao Miljavac (born 1953), army general
- Omar Pasha (1806–1871), field marshal
- Petar Stipetić (1937–2018), general
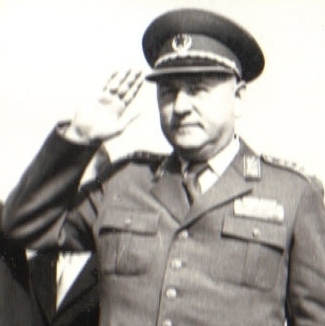
Gošnjak

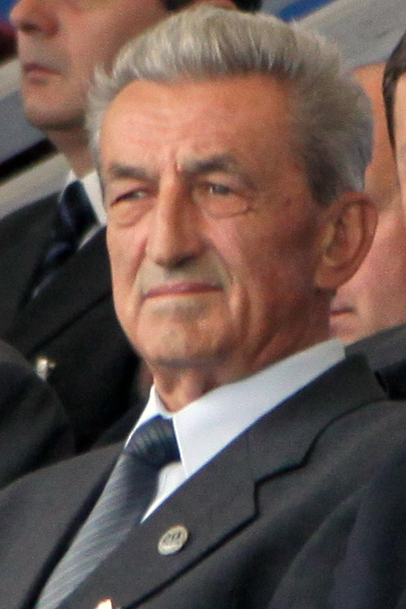
Stipetić

== Musicians ==
- Davor Gobac (born 1964), singer
- Ema Pukšec (1834–1889), soprano opera singer
- Ana Vidović (born 1980), Silvije Vidović and Viktor Vidović (1973), academic musicians
- Viktor Vidović (born 1973), guitarist
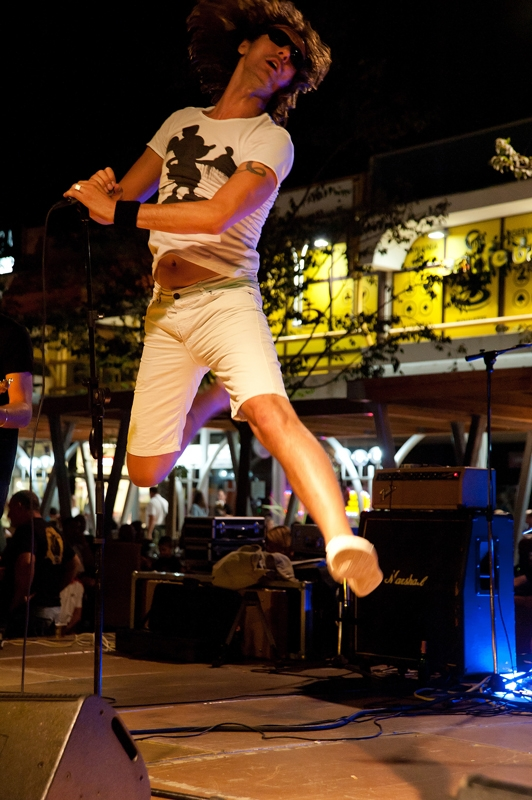
Gobac

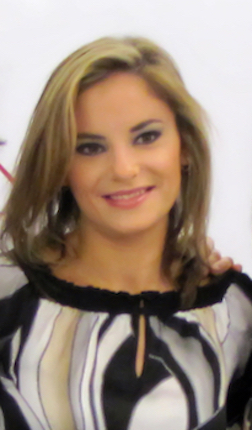
Vidović

== Politicians ==
- Elvira Abdić-Jelenović (born 1967), politician
- Ivan Banjavčić (1843–1913), Mayor of Karlovac
- Josip Boljkovac (1920–2014), politician, Minister of the Interior
- Nikolina Brnjac (born 1978), politician, Ministry of Tourism and Sports of Croatia
- Većeslav Holjevac (1917–1970), Mayor of Zagreb
- Daniel Ivin (1932–2021), politician, activist, writer
- Fran Krsto Frankopan (1643–1671), politician, nobleman and writer.
- Josip Kregar (1953–2020), politician, Mayor of Zagreb
- Miroslav Lazanski (1950–2021), military analyst, politician and a diplomat, ambassador of Serbia to Russia
- Miodrag Linta (born 1969), politician and activist
- Blaž Lorković (1839–1892), economist, lawyer
- Ivan Mažuranić (1814–1890), poet, linguist and politician.
- Ivan Ribar (1881–1968), politician
- Ivan Šubašić (1892–1955), politician, last Ban of Croatia
- Ivan Vilibor Sinčić (born 1990), President of the Living Wall
- Branko Vukelić (1958–2013), politician, 11th Minister of Defence of Croatia
- Nikola Vuljanić (1949–2024), politician, member of the European Parliament for Croatia
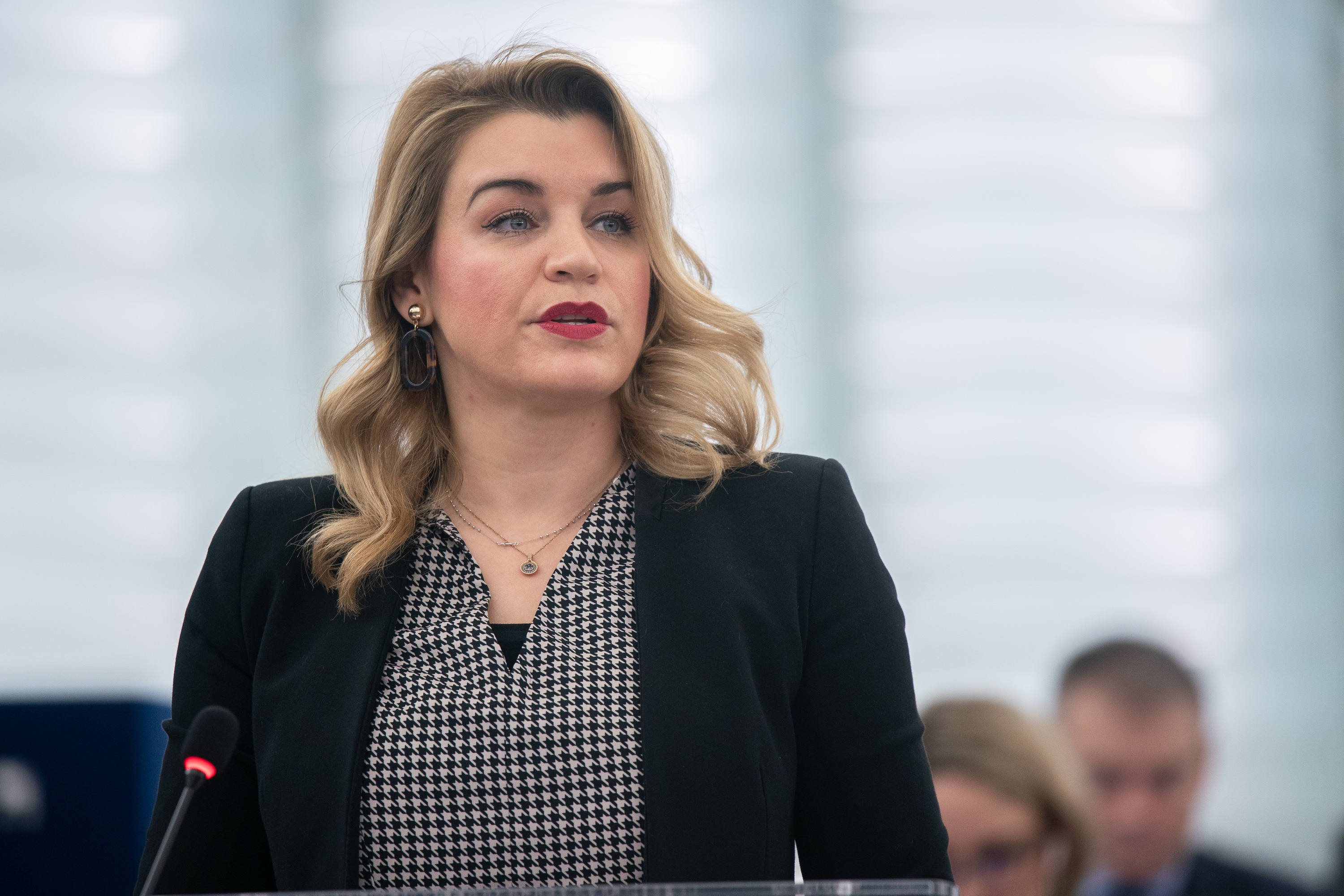
Brnjac

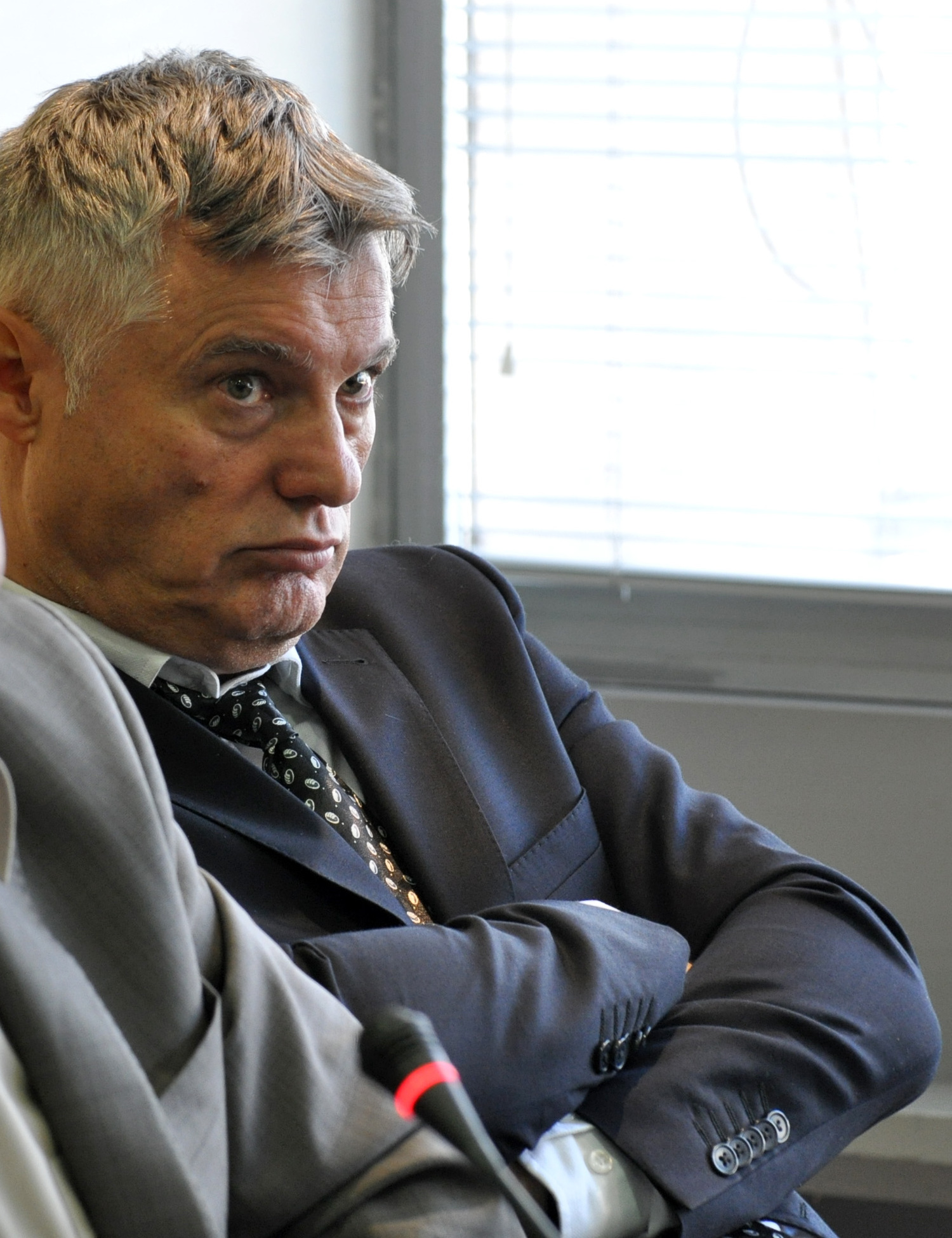
Lazanski

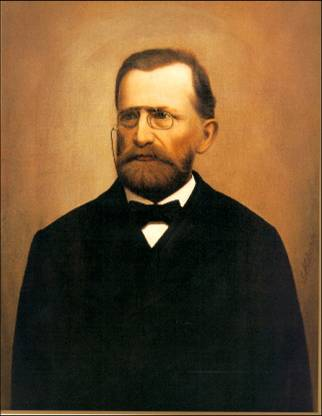
Lorković

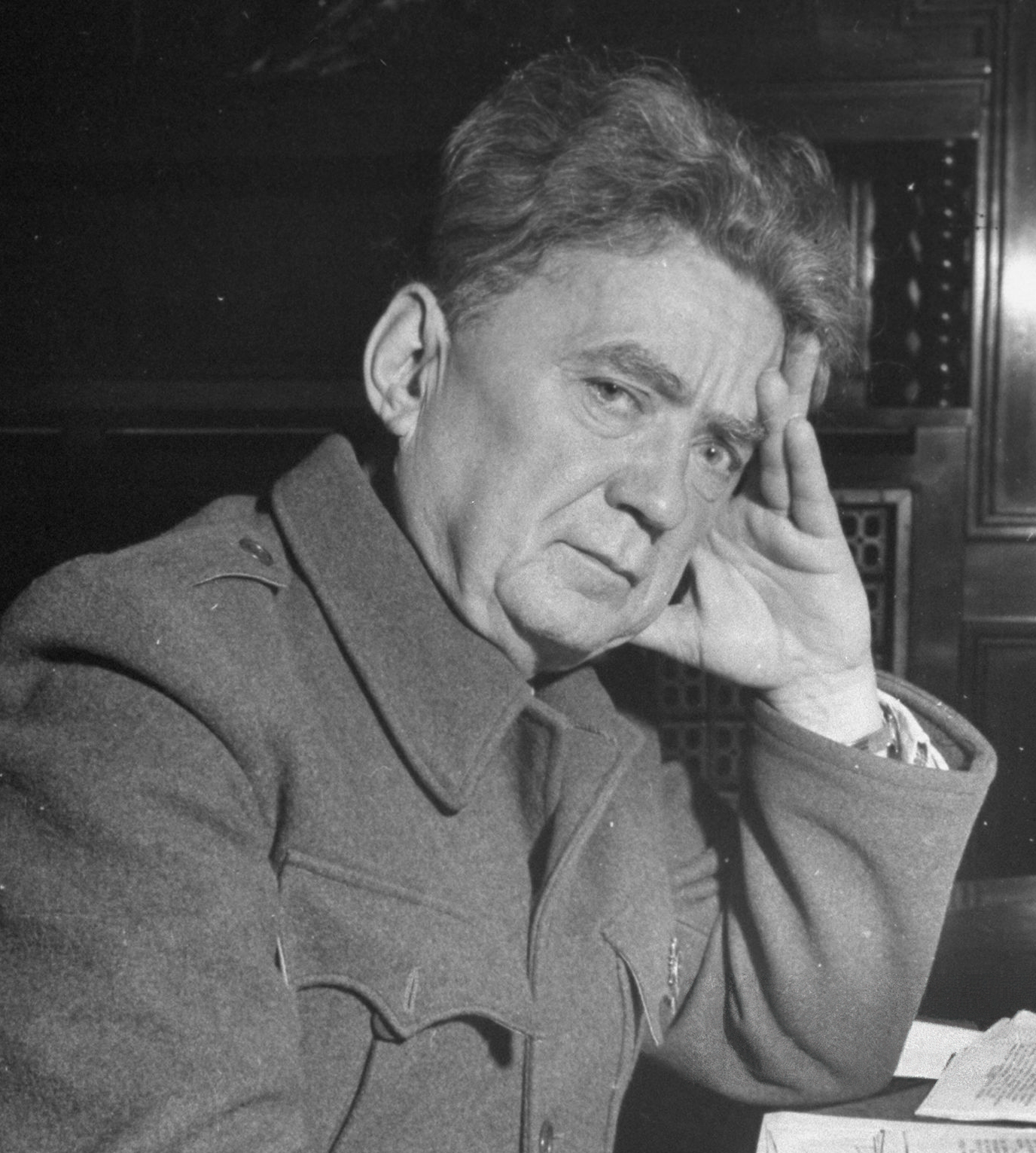
Ribar

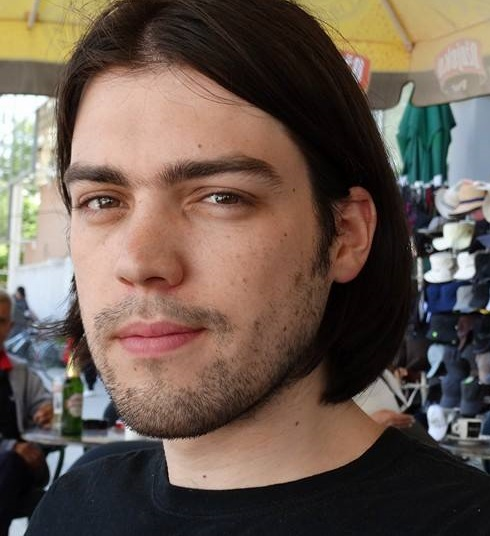
Sinčić

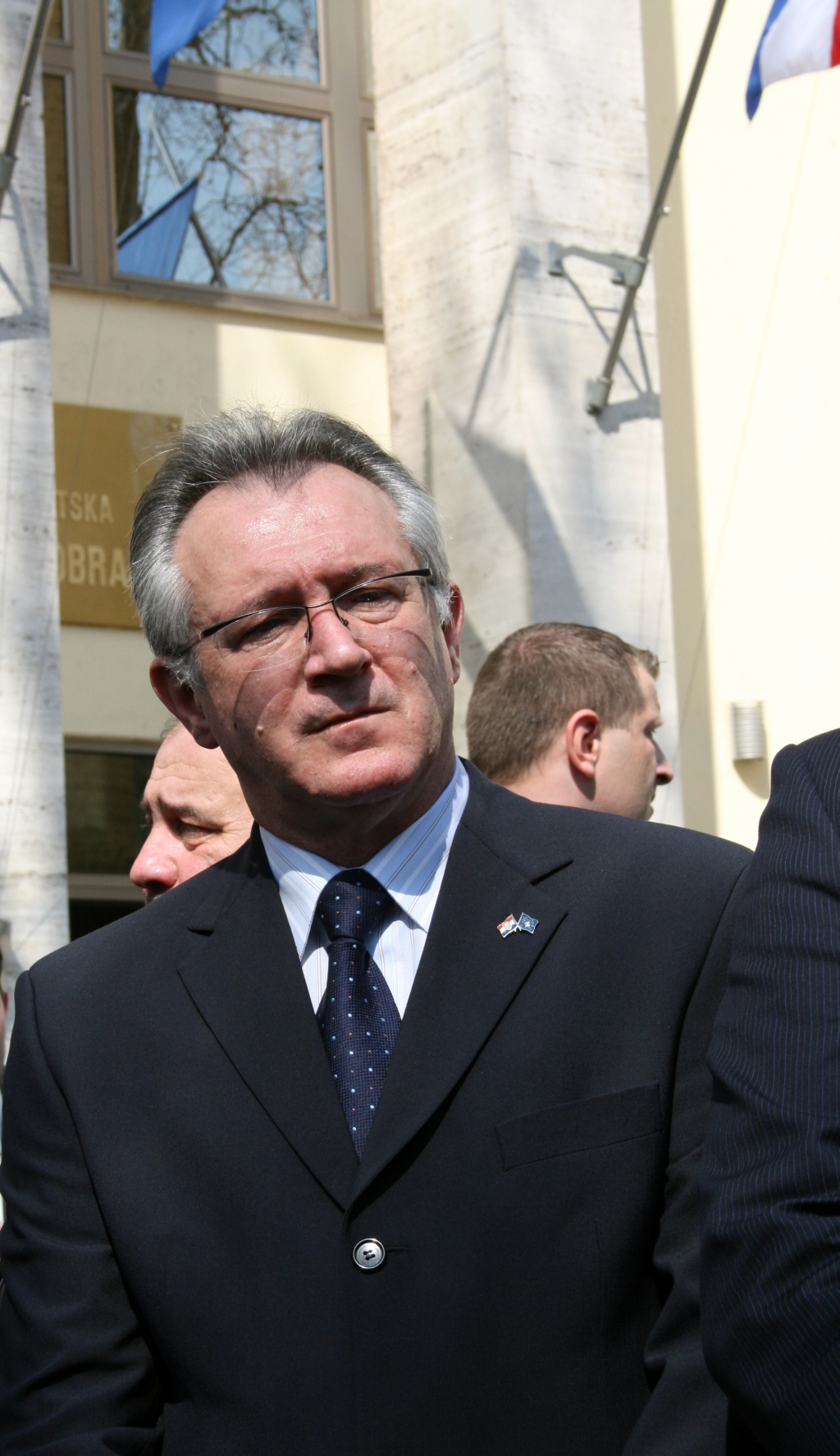
Vukelić

== Historians, intellectuals, scientists ==
- Vladimir Goldner (1933–2017), physician and professor
- Ljudevit Jonke (1907–1979), linguist
- Božidar Liščić (born 1929), engineer, member of the Croatian Academy of Sciences and Arts
- Radoslav Lopašić (1835–1893), historian
- Gojko Nikoliš (1911–1995), physician and historian
- Anđelko Milardović (born 1956), political scientist
- Sava Mrkalj (1783–1833), linguist, grammarian, philologist, poet
- Gajo Petrović (1927–1993), author and philosopher
- Elza Polak (1910–1995), horticulturist
- Ivo Protulipac, physician, a lawyer, and an important Catholic activist
- Vanja Sutlić (1925–1989), philosopher
- Živko Vrcelj (born 1959), doctor and politicians
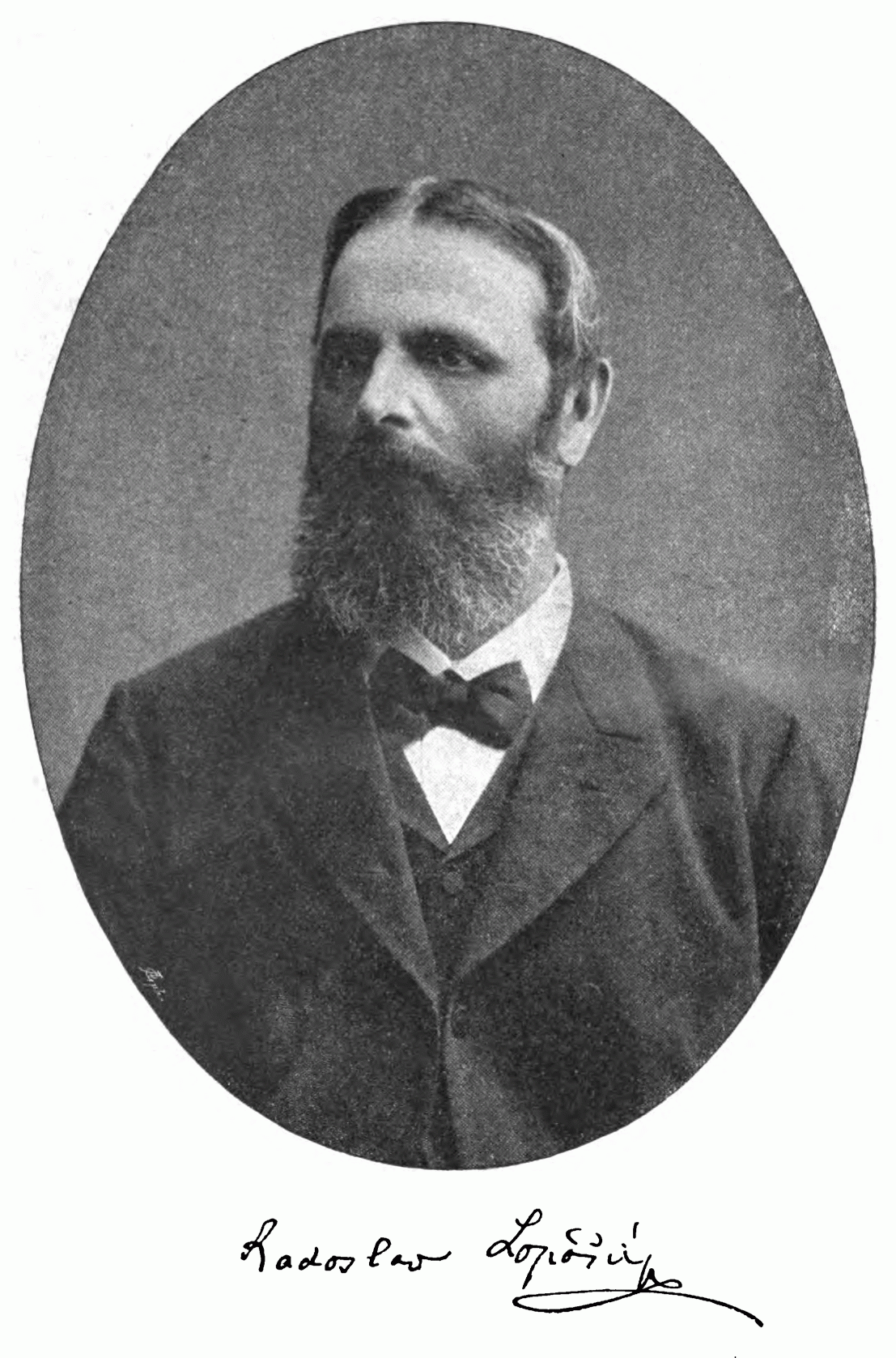
Lopašić

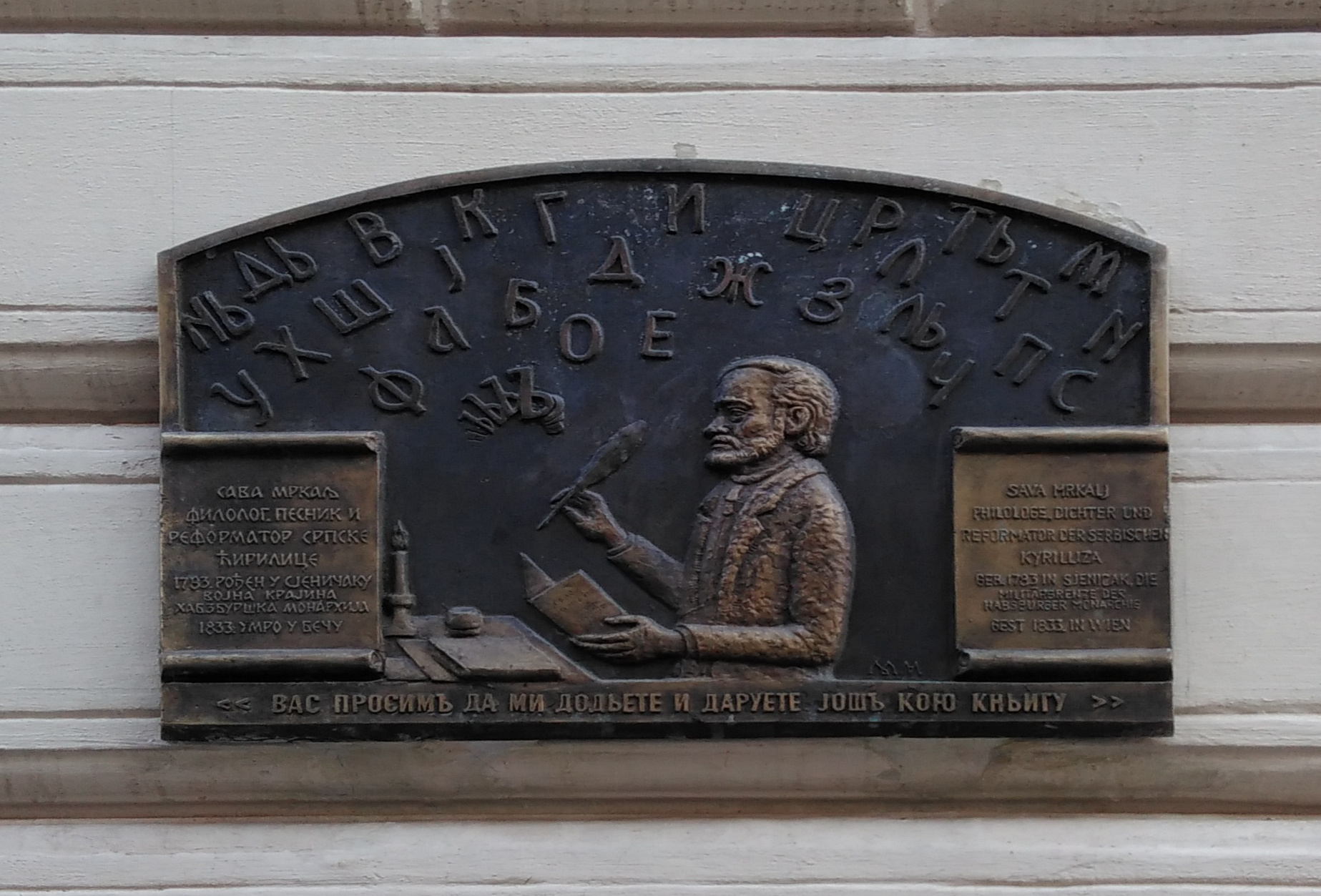
Mrkalj

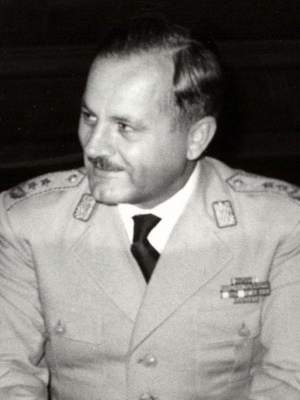
Nikoliš

Protulipac

== Athletes ==
- Boris Batinić (born 1981), handball player
- Bill Belichick (born 1952) and Steve Belichick (1919–2005) football coaches born in the U.S., whose ancestors were from near Karlovac
- Dražen Bolić (born 1971), football player
- Goran Bunjevčević (1973–2018), football player
- Mirko Bunjevčević (born 1978), football player
- Damir Čavlović (born 1952), handball player
- Luka Cindrić (born 1993), handball player
- Borislav Cvetković (born 1964), Yugoslav footballer
- Zvjezdan Cvetković (1960–2017), football manager and player
- Miloš Hrstić (born 1955), former footballer for HNK Rijeka and Yugoslavia's national team
- Nikolina Ilijanić (born 1983), basketball player
- Dejan Jakovic (born 1985), Canadian soccer player
- Marko Jakšić (born 1987), football defender and player
- Rajko Janjanin (born 1957), football player
- Tihomir Jarnjević (born 1978), rower
- Peter Kokotowitsch (1890–1968), wrestler.
- Branko Kokir (born 1974), handball player
- Simeon Kosanović (born 1933), former basketball and handball player
- Željko Kosanović (born 1934), former basketball and handball player
- Nikola Krajinović (born 1999), football player
- Josip Krznarić (born 1993), football player
- Jurica Lakić (1953–1982), handball player who played for RK Zamet and Yugoslavia's national team
- Adrijana Lekaj (born 1995), tennis player.
- Elvis Letaj (born 2003), football player
- Kristijan Lovrić (born 1955), football player
- Dino Martinović (born 1990), football player
- Snježana Mijić (born 1971), volleyball player
- Boris Mutić (1939–2009), sports reporter, working for Croatian national television (HRT)
- Milan Neralić (1875–1918), fencer, won a bronze medal at the Olympics
- Igor Novaković (born 1979), football midfielder
- Sandro Obranović (born 1992), handball player
- Vladimir Ostarčević (born 1982), handball player
- Ante Pavić (born 1989), tennis player
- Jelica Pavličić-Štefančić (born 1954), athlete, multiple champion of Yugoslavia in the 100m, 200m and 400m; 400 m world record holder
- Dražen Perković (born 1963), taekwondo practitioner
- Željko Perušić (1936–2017), football player who played for Dinamo Zagreb and Yugoslavia
- Predrag Počuča (born 1986), football player
- Jelena Popović (born 1984), handball player
- Krešimir Račić (1932–1994), hammer thrower
- Milan Šašić (born 1958), football manager and player
- Antun Stipančić (1949–1991), table tennis player
- Tin Vukmanić (born 1999), footballer
- Dragomir Vukobratović (born 1988), footballer
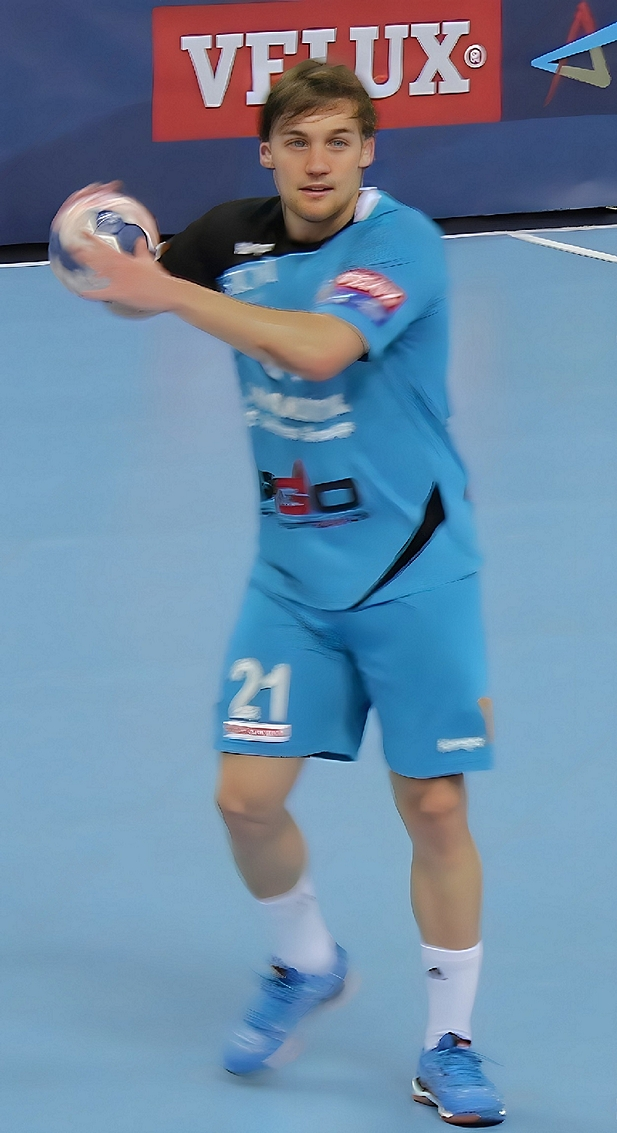
Cindrić

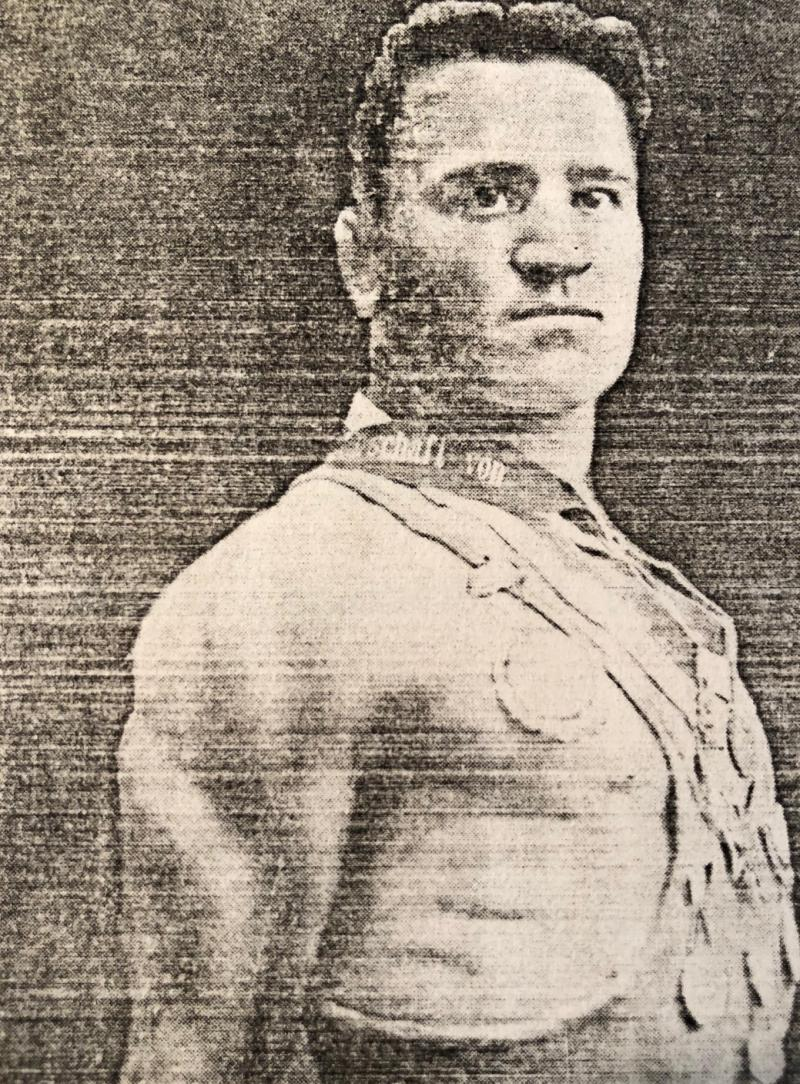
Kokotowitsch

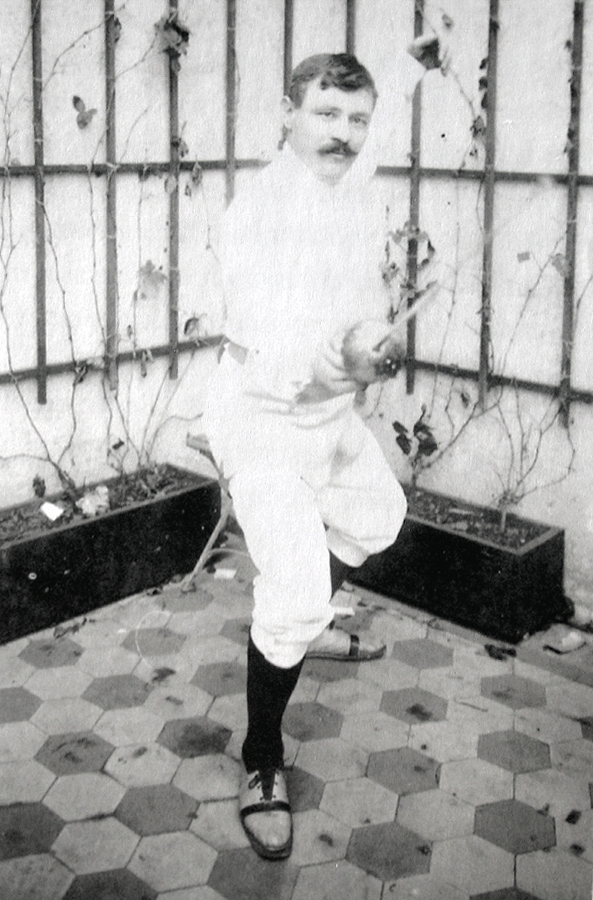
Neralić

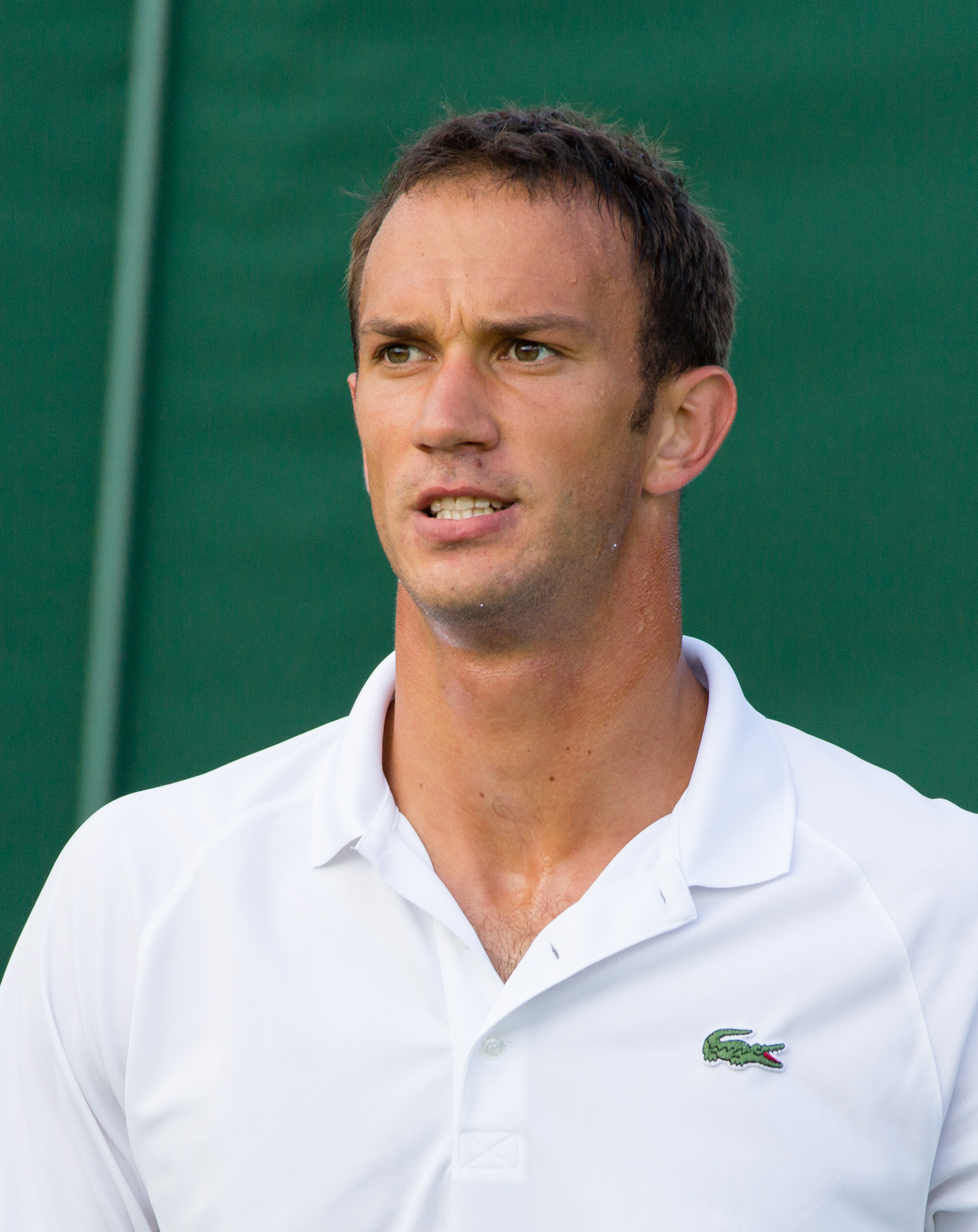
Pavić

== Religion ==
- Mile Bogović (1939–2020), titular bishop of Tamata and diocesan bishop of Gospić-Senj
- Branko Dobrosavljević (1886–1941), Serbian Orthodox priest, killed in WW2
- Danica Širola (1900-1926), school teacher, poet and Catholic laywoman
- Maksimilijan Vrhovac (1752–1827), Bishop of Zagreb
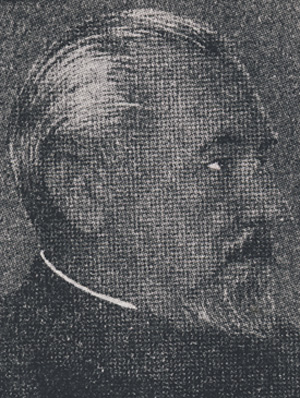
Dobrosavljević

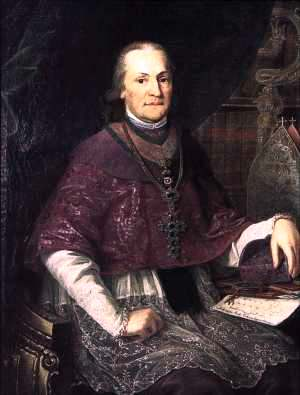
Vrhovac

== Other ==
- Jelka Glumičić (1941–2020). activist
- Mirko and Stjepan Seljan (1871 – 20th century) (1875–1936), explorers
- Ilona Zrínyi (1643–1707), daughter of Petar Zrinski
- Katarina Zrinska (1625–1673), influential woman from the Frankopan family
