= Nikolina =

- Gender: Female

Origin
- Word/name: Slavic
- Meaning: Slavic equivalent of Nicole

Nikolina is the given name of:

- Nikolina Angelkova (born 1979), Bulgarian politician
- Nikolina Baradić (born 1990) is a Croatian politician
- Nikolina Božičević (born 1995), Croatian volleyball player
- Nikolina Brnjac (born 1978), Croatian politician
- Nikolina Grabovac (born 1968), Croatian basketball player
- Nikolina Ilijanić (born 1983), Croatian basketball player
- Nikolina Moldovan (born 1990), Serbian sprint canoer
- Nikolina Plavšić (born 2001), Serbian footballer
- Nikolina Ristović (née Pišek; born 1973), Croatian TV presenter
- Nikolina Ruseva (born 1943), Bulgarian sprint canoer
- Nikolina Shtereva (born 1955), Bulgarian middle distance runner
- Nikolina Stepan (born 1988), Croatian long distance runner
- Nikolina Tankoucheva (born 1986), Bulgarian artistic gymnast
- Nikolina Vukčević (born 2000), Montenegrin handball player
- Nikolina Zadravec (born 1997), Croatian handball player

Nikolina may also refer to:

- "Nikolina", a 1917 song recorded by Hjalmar Peterson.
