= Brnjac =

Brnjac may refer to:

- Brnjac, Serbia, a village near Loznica
- Mario Brnjac (1944–2007), Croatian football player
- Nikolina Brnjac (born 1978), Croatian politician
