= Youth Sports Games =

International amateur multi-sport youth competition in Croatia

- Sportske Igre Mladih
- Abbreviation: YSG
- Formation: May 2, 1996; 30 years ago
- Founded at: Split, Croatia
- Type: International Sports Manifestation
- Headquarters: Split, Croatia
- Founder and president: Zdravko Marić
- Vice-president: Tihomir Gudić
- Website: https://www.youthsportsgames.com/en/

The Plazma Youth Sports Games (YSG) are the largest amateur sports event for children and young people in Europe. They were founded on May 21, 1996, in Split, Croatia, by Zdravko Marić, who envisioned a platform for promoting sports, healthy lifestyles, positive social values, and friendships among children and young people. The YSG were developed as a professional international competition, making them accessible to everyone, free of charge and regardless of athletic experience.

Since their beginning, the YSG have been held continuously and have grown from a local event into an international project, attracting more than 3,088,000 participants by 2024. A unique feature of the Youth Sports Games is that everyone can participate, whether they are actively involved in sports or want to try one of the athletic disciplines. Although it is an amateur sports event, all activities are carried out according to the standards of professional competitions, and participation is entirely free of charge.

In addition to the sports component, the YSG also deliver educational programs focused on ecology, traffic safety, combating violence, and the prevention of drug abuse, further promoting positive societal values.

In 2024 alone, the Games gathered more than 320,000 participants.

The Games are organised under the auspices of the International Olympic Committee, UEFA, and FIDE, as well as under the honorary patronage of the President of Croatia and Ministry of Tourism and Sports.

== Mission and vision ==
YSG's vision is to promote tolerance, friendship, solidarity, social inclusion, fair play, and educate on all aspects of sustainable development.

== Impact ==
Numerous world institutions, governments of participating countries, top athletes, sponsors, and officials have recognized the Plazma Youth Sports Games, which is an integral part of the event’s positive image.

The YSG promote values such as fair play, tolerance, team spirit, and togetherness through ten athletic disciplines – futsal, street basketball, handball, volleyball, beach volleyball, tennis, table tennis, chess, athletics, and dodgeball. The YSG are the answer to challenges such as sedentary lifestyle, lack of physical activity, and excessive use of technology.

The slogan "A Step for a Better Future" accurately reflects their mission – to contribute to building responsible individuals of the future through a mass sports platform where participants develop a sense of inclusion, community spirit, humanity, and respect for diversity. Today, the Plazma Youth Sports Games are active in four countries: Croatia, Bosnia and Herzegovina, Slovenia, and Serbia, and continue to expand their mission of connecting young people through sports while promoting a healthy and active lifestyle across the region.

== History ==
The Youth Sports Games began in 1996 in Split, Croatia, inspired by football tournaments organized as part of church activities. The primary motive was the lack of sports events in the city during the summer, as well as the need to counteract the rising consumption of opiates, which was becoming a growing concern in Split at the time.

Under the name "Youth Olympics of Split," the first competitions were held in June 1996, in which about 5200 children participated. From the start, the goal of the YSG was to gather as many children as possible to engage in sports and socialize, all the while ensuring that participation remained entirely free of charge. Founder Zdravko Marić recalled the early challenges and successes in an interview for Večernji list, stating, "When we started from Brda, we never imagined we would reach this level. It all feels like a movie. The first Games were sponsored by athletes." and: "The first to recognize my enthusiasm were the players of the Croatian national football team who played at Euro 1996; I managed to collect their phone numbers, I knew that they supported various projects and were deceived quite a few times, but believing in the Games, I started calling them in alphabetical order, and first called Alen Bokšić. After Alen's support, I believed even more in what I was doing. Slaven Bilić, Igor Štimac, Zvonimir Soldo, and Mario Stanić also provided support, and other athletes such as Dino Rađa, Toni Kukoč, and Goran Ivanišević joined in."

The Youth Sports Games started as a football tournament, but quickly expanded due to immense interest. Basketball, handball, volleyball, tennis, and table tennis were added soon. Over the years, sports such as judo, badminton, and water polo were also included. Today, children and young people have the opportunity to compete in 10 different sports disciplines, with promotional tournaments and pilot projects introducing new sports.

The long-standing motto "Let's live a life without drugs because drugs take lives" was the key message of the Youth Sports Games, aimed at raising awareness of the harmfulness of drugs and promoting healthy lifestyle habits. Through education and sports, the Games encouraged young people to choose positive values and responsibility toward themselves and society.

In 2008, children from five neighboring countries participated in the Youth Sports Games for the first time. The "International Days" was a pilot project for future expansion, with over 40,000 children participating in the Games that year.

Bosnia and Herzegovina was the first country to officially join the Youth Sports Games in 2011. That year, more than 50,000 children participated. In Serbia, the competitions were held for the first time in 2013.

The growing popularity of YSG is reflected in the increasing number of participants. In 2016, the YSG celebrated their 20th anniversary. "In these 20 years, over 800,000 children from all parts of Croatia have participated in the Games. In recent years, Bosnia and Herzegovina and Serbia have joined the project. The fact that around 62,000 children (in Croatia) participated in the Games during the last year alone shows the level of recognition the Games have gained. About 38,000 children participated in Bosnia and Herzegovina, and about 30,000 more in Serbia.”, Marić pointed out.

In 2024, Slovenia joined the YSG as the fourth member. That year marked a record in participation, with 328,870 children from the four member countries.

=== YSG through the years ===
- May 21, 1996 – the idea of establishing the Youth Sports Games was born.
- June 1996 – the first Youth Sports Games, called the "Youth Olympics of Split".
- 2000 – The Games organized throughout Croatia, with 30,000 competitors.
- 2004 – First patronage of the European Parliament.
- 2006 – 10th anniversary of the Youth Sports Games.
- 2008 – First International Youth Sports Games Days, European Commission supports the YSG.
- 2011 – The first Youth Sports Games held in Bosnia and Herzegovina.
- 2014 – Serbia joins the Youth Sports Games.
- 2014 – First International Finals of the Youth Sports Games.
- 2015 – The first Sports Day / Tour of Joy.
- 2020 – The UEFA Foundation for Children supported the YSG through a campaign to promote women's football — "Home rules".
- 2020 – 10 seasons of the Games in BiH, the international finals in Sarajevo.
- 2021 – 25th anniversary of the Youth Sports Games[, support of FIDE – World Chess Organization.
- 2022 – the first "Zero Waste - Be part of the game - Save our planet" educational campaign.
- 2023 – The first All-star day in Split.
- 2024 – The first season of the Youth Sports Games in Slovenia.

Countries where the YSG are currently held
Participating country	Year of foundation of the YSG	Years of activity	Number of participants in 2024
Croatia	1996	29	109.986
Bosnia and Herzegovina	2010	15	65.102
Serbia	2013	12	119.012
Slovenia	2024	2	34.770

== Support and Ambassadors ==
The Games enjoy the support of Aleksander Čeferin, Johannes Hahn, Karl-Heinz Rummenigge, Luka Modrić, Nemanja Matić, and Edin Džeko, among others.

== Sports Disciplines ==
Students compete in 10 sports disciplines: mini-football, handball, tennis, table tennis, chess, 3x3 basketball, volleyball, beach volleyball, athletics, and dodgeball. The competitions begin at the city, county, or inter-county level, with the finals held in Split. Participation is completely free for children at all levels.

Children and young people from 6 to 18 years of age have the opportunity to participate completely free of charge, regardless of their skills or experience in any sport. The Games encourage children and young people to actively participate in a healthy lifestyle by being open to everyone.

All competitions are held according to professional standards, which include professional referees, delegates, professional sports fields, and trained associates. Competitions are organized at a professional level, although it is an amateur sports event, following all regulations and rules of each sport.

Age and gender groups in the YSG sport disciplines
Sport	Men	Women	Mixed
Coca-Cola cup	U16, U18	U16	
Futsal			U12
Handball	U15	U15	
Street basketball	U15	U15	
Chess	U11, U15	U11, U15	
Dodgeball			U9, U11
60m sprint race	U9, U11	U9, U11	
Tennis	U9, U10, U14	U9, U10, U14	
Table tennis	U12, U15, U18	U12, U15, U18	
Handball	U15	U15, U17	
Beach volleyball	U15	U15	

== Competitions ==
Boys and girls aged 7 to 18 have the opportunity to participate in competitions held between January and September. The competitions are free and open to all teams, including casual enthusiasts who embrace a healthy lifestyle and socialising, not just those who are actively or professionally involved in sports.

The competitions are organized at a professional level, despite being amateur in nature, adhering to the internationally accepted rules and regulations of each sport.

== Competition System ==
- First level — Qualifications/city competitions — are held in cities and towns, ensuring the availability of competitions to as many children and young people as possible, following the goal of the Games.
- Second level — County Finals — are held in county centers according to the criteria set by the YSG. Teams and individuals who have qualified in qualifications/city competitions participate.
- Third level — Regional tournaments — the winners of county tournaments compete in regional tournaments. The goal of these competitions is to qualify for the State Finals.
- Fourth level — The State Finals — are held in July; participants from 10 sports disciplines socialize and compete with peers from all parts of the country. Various educational and entertainment events are organized for participants as part of the State Finals. The State Finals are also followed by many successful athletes who participate in medal ceremonies.
- Fifth level — The International Finals — are the highlight of the Youth Sports Games season. In addition to sports competitions, state winners from Croatia, Bosnia and Herzegovina, Serbia, and Slovenia have the opportunity to meet their peers from other countries, participate in entertainment and educational programs, and meet some of their sports idols, which enrich the experience of the participants. As part of the International Finals, a great entertainment spectacle is organized to close the season of the Games on Split's Riva. In addition to the children and the participants, the International Finals are followed by numerous people from sports, economic, and political life of Europe. The final matches and programs attract media attention, with live broadcasts on national and regional television channels in 9 countries. From 2023, in addition to the International Finals, the Plazma Youth Sports Games also organize an All-Star Day.

== Coca-Cola Cup ==
The mini-football part of the games is organized as the Coca-Cola Cup, the biggest mini-football tournament in Europe. In 2024, the tournament's 11th edition took place in over 100 cities and towns across Croatia and 21 counties.

The tournaments are divided into two categories: U-18 and U-15.

The Coca-Cola Cup serves as a platform for promoting sports values, fair play, and team spirit among the youth. Qualifying tournaments are held in cities from January to May, followed by county finals. Winners of the county finals advance to the National Finals held in Split.

Each tournament showcases fair play and sportsmanship, with a significant incentive: a spot in the National Finals in Split. In 2024, over 45,000 childre from across Croatia participated in the Coca-Cola Cup tournament.
