= Boris Matić =

Boris Matić may refer to:

- Boris T. Matić (born 1966), Croatian film producer
- Boris Matić (footballer) (born 2004), Serbian footballer

== See also ==
- Boris Mutić (1939-2009), Croatian sports reporter
