= Modern European ink painting =

Global contemporary art movement

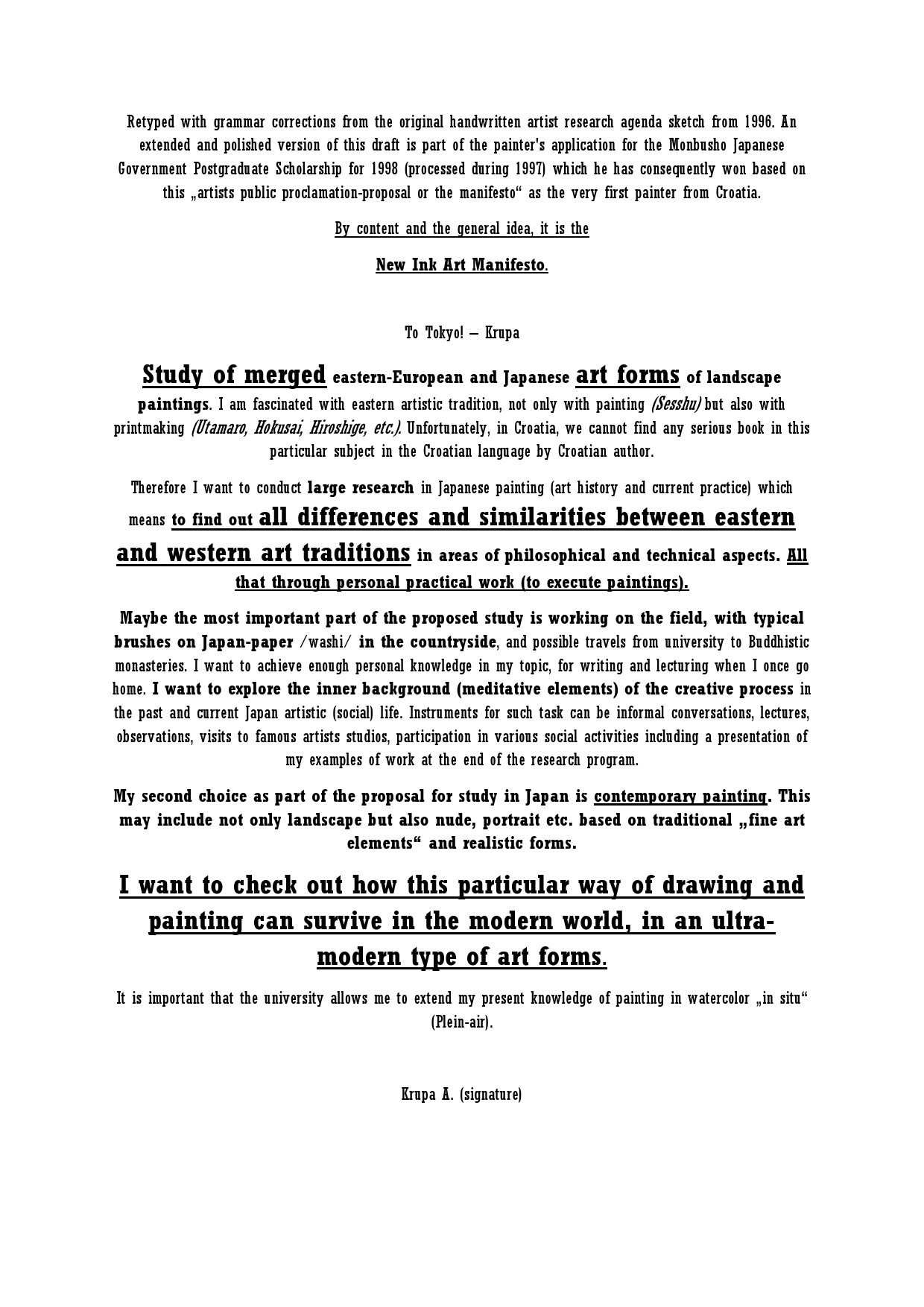
New Ink Art Manifesto by Alfred Freddy Krupa (1996)

Modern European ink painting (sometimes called the "New Ink Movement" or the "New Ink Art") is an emerging style that reaches beyond traditional Asian ink painting in scope and treatment of a minimalist-art. Contemporary ink painting is developing, gaining recognition it deserves, and establishing its own place among the major pictorial works of the world. This global contemporary art movement represents a sort of amalgamation of the Western visual art problems and practices with those of East Asia. Lin Fengmian, Xu Beihong, and Wu Guanzhong were revered as the most pioneering Western-trained artists. Lui Shou Kwan (1919-1975) is credited with founding the New Ink Painting Movement. List of notable painters can include Chou Lu Yun, Irene (1924-2011), Chui Tze-Hung (b. 1936), Kan Tai-Keung (b. 1942), Koo Mei, Carrie (b. 1929), Leung But-Yin (b. 1940), Leung Kui-Ting (b.1945), Ng Yiu-Chung (1935-1987), Poon Chun-Wah (b.1936), Wong King-Seng (b. 1928), Yeung Yick-Chung (1921-1981) and others. Lui Shou-kwan and his followers (up to the present times) reinterpreted Chinese ink art in the form of Western modernism.

== New Ink Art movement on West (Global Ink Art movement) ==
The founder of the European/Western variant/contribution to the (mainly Asian) Modern ink painting movement is Alfred Freddy Krupa. Krupa who is not a follower of Lui Shou-kwan (and in China is called "the Foreign Master") is doing something essentially opposite/different from Shou Kwan and his group, he reinterprets Western modernism in the form of the Far East ink art. It combines Expressionism, Art Informel, Minimalism, plein air work, Abstract Art (etc.) with a typically East Asian approach (Jürgen Weichardt 2016, Francesco Scagliola 2017, Ante Vranković 2018, Elena Martinique 2019).

The original manuscript of Krupa's New Ink Art Manifesto from 1996 is the property of the documenta (exhibition) archiv, records and papers collection in Kassel.
