= Karlovac County =

County in central Croatia

Coordinates: 45°29′35″N 15°33′21″E

Karlovac County Karlovačka županija (Croatian)
- County
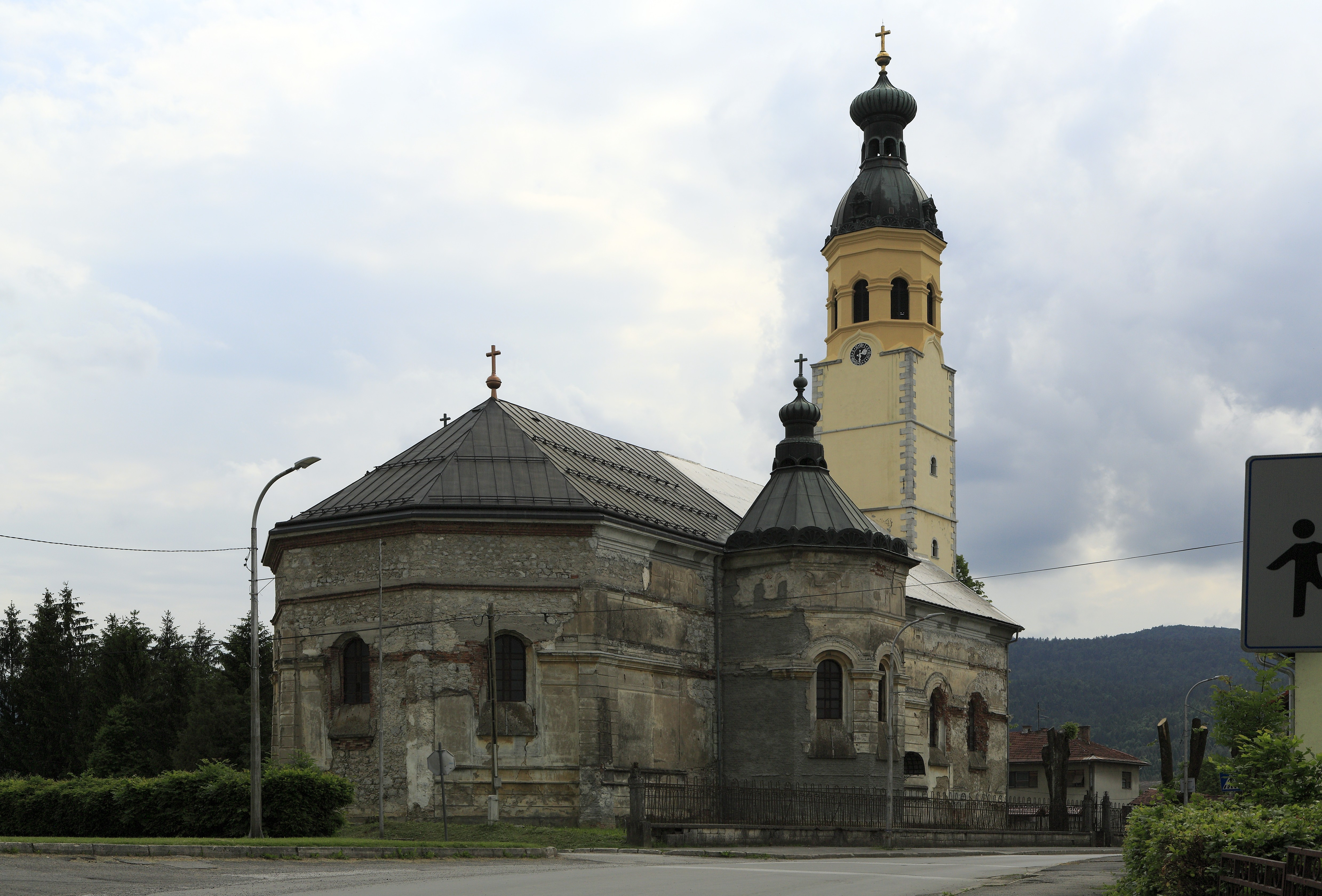
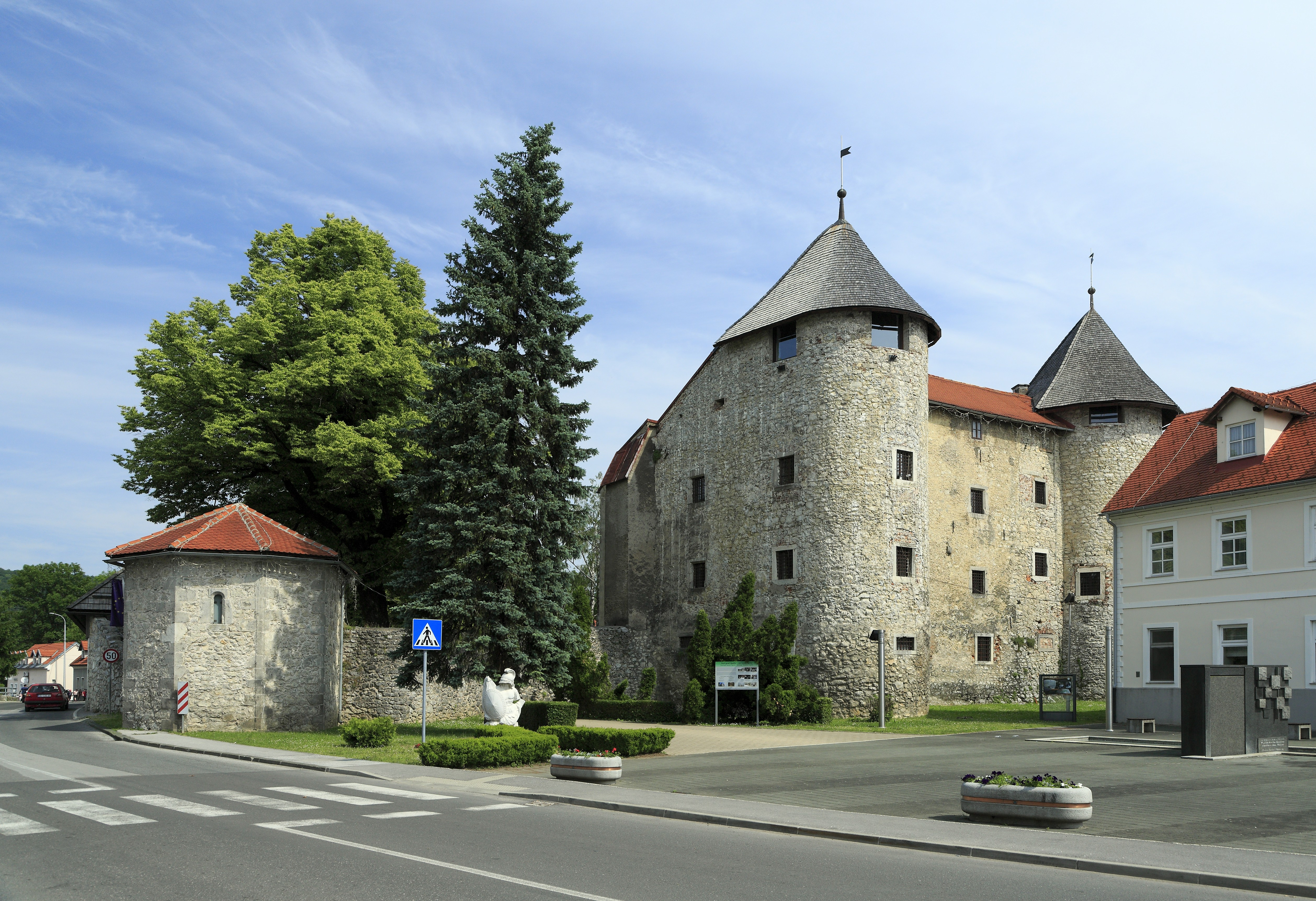
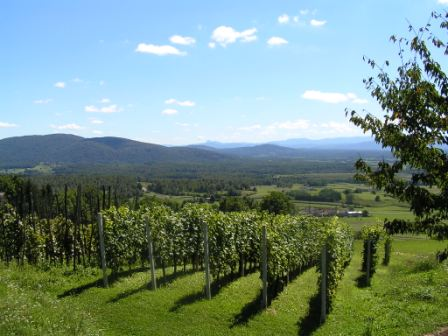
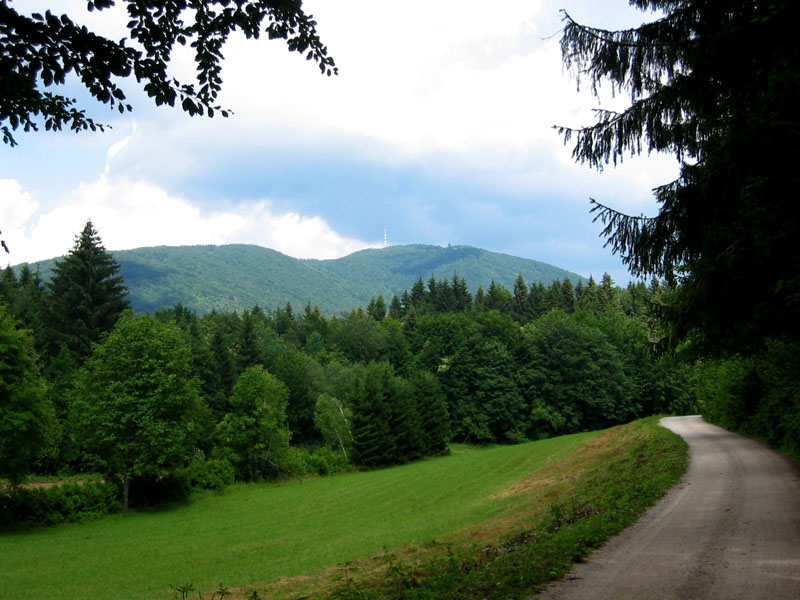
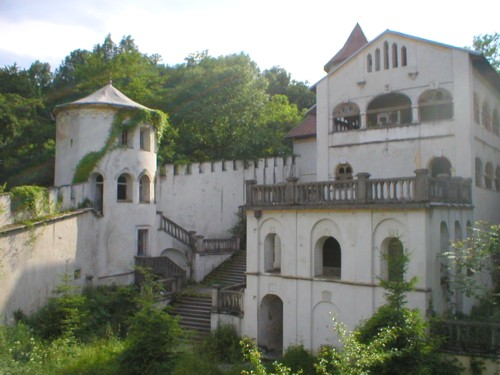
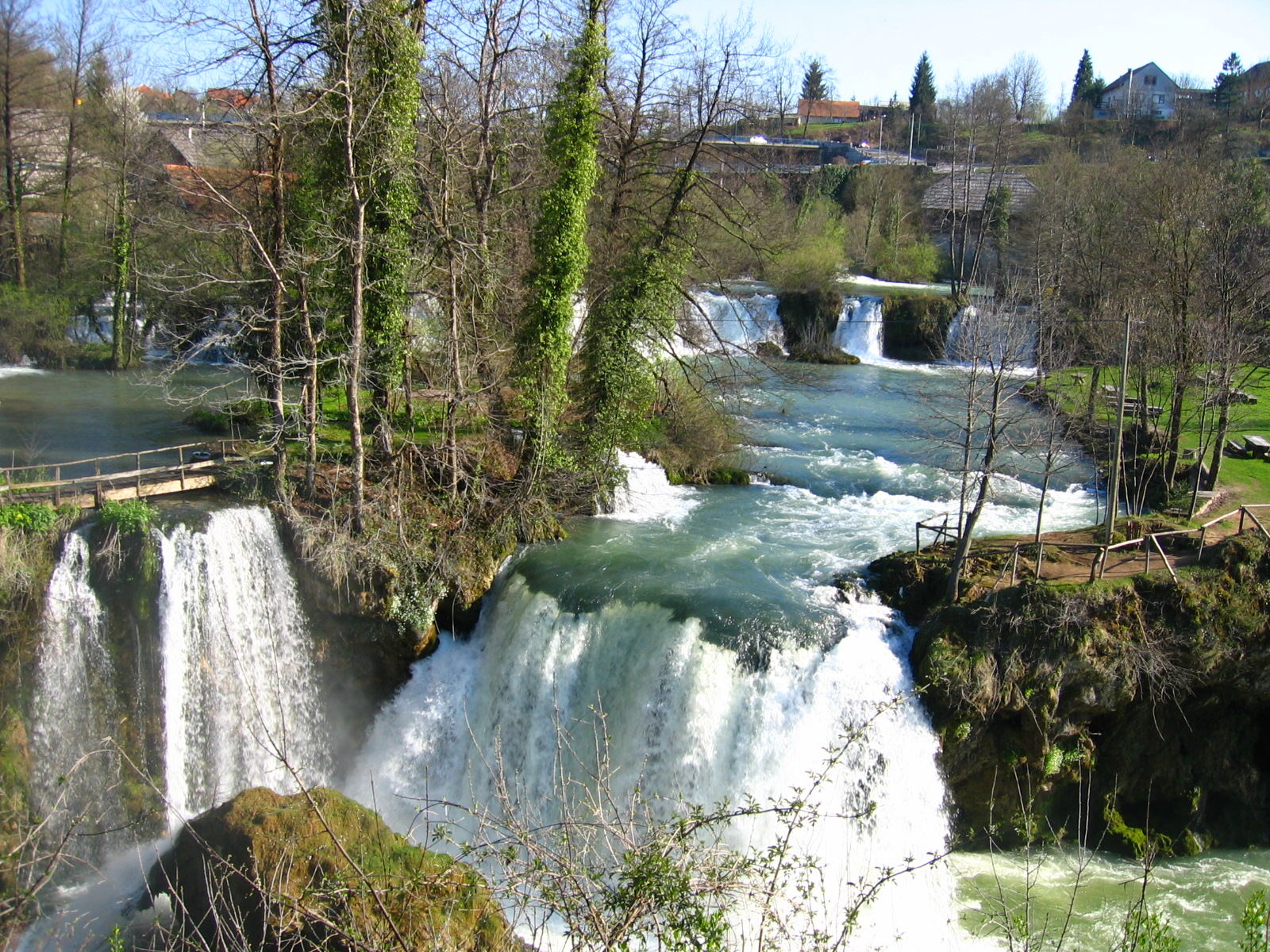
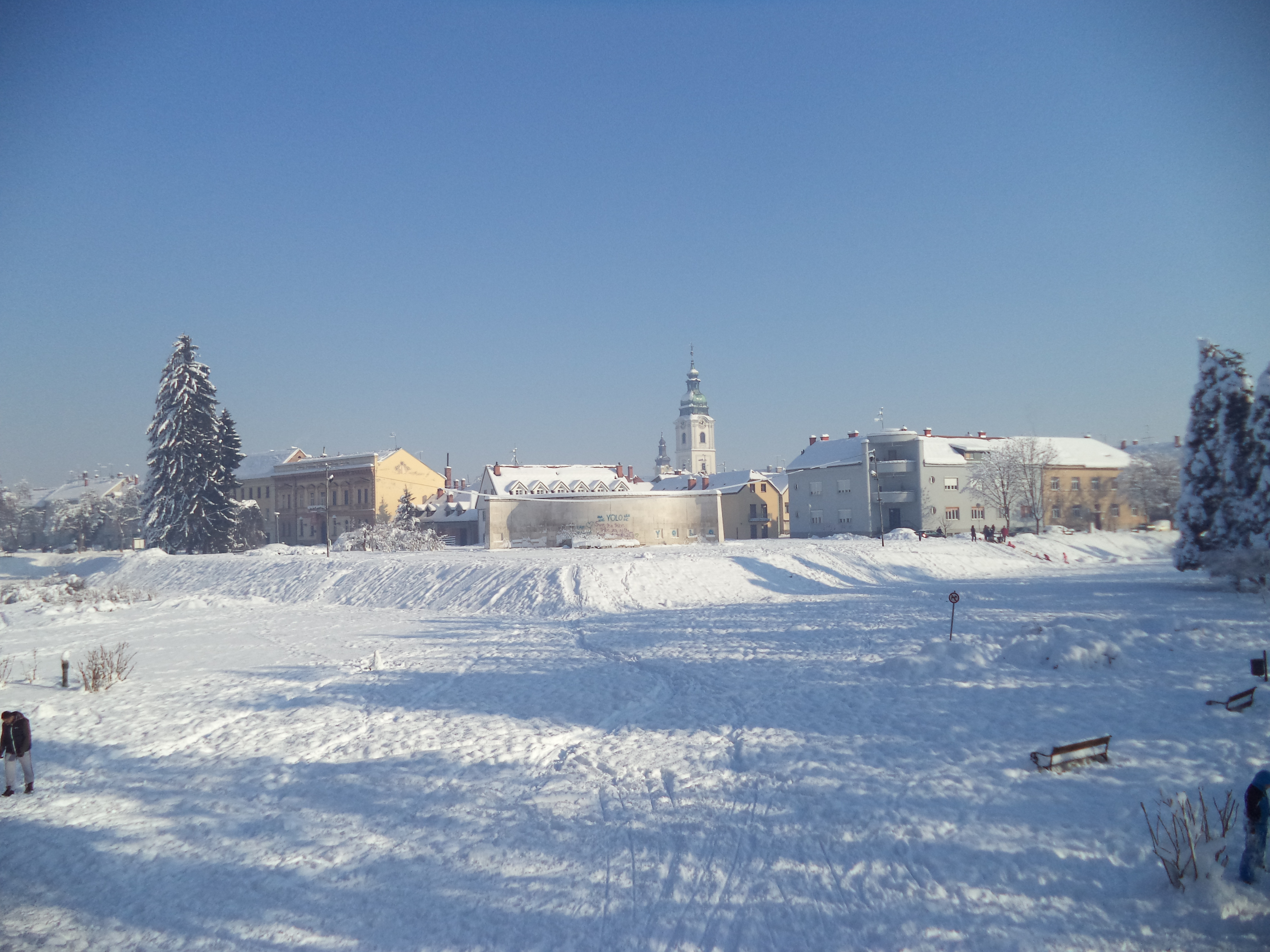
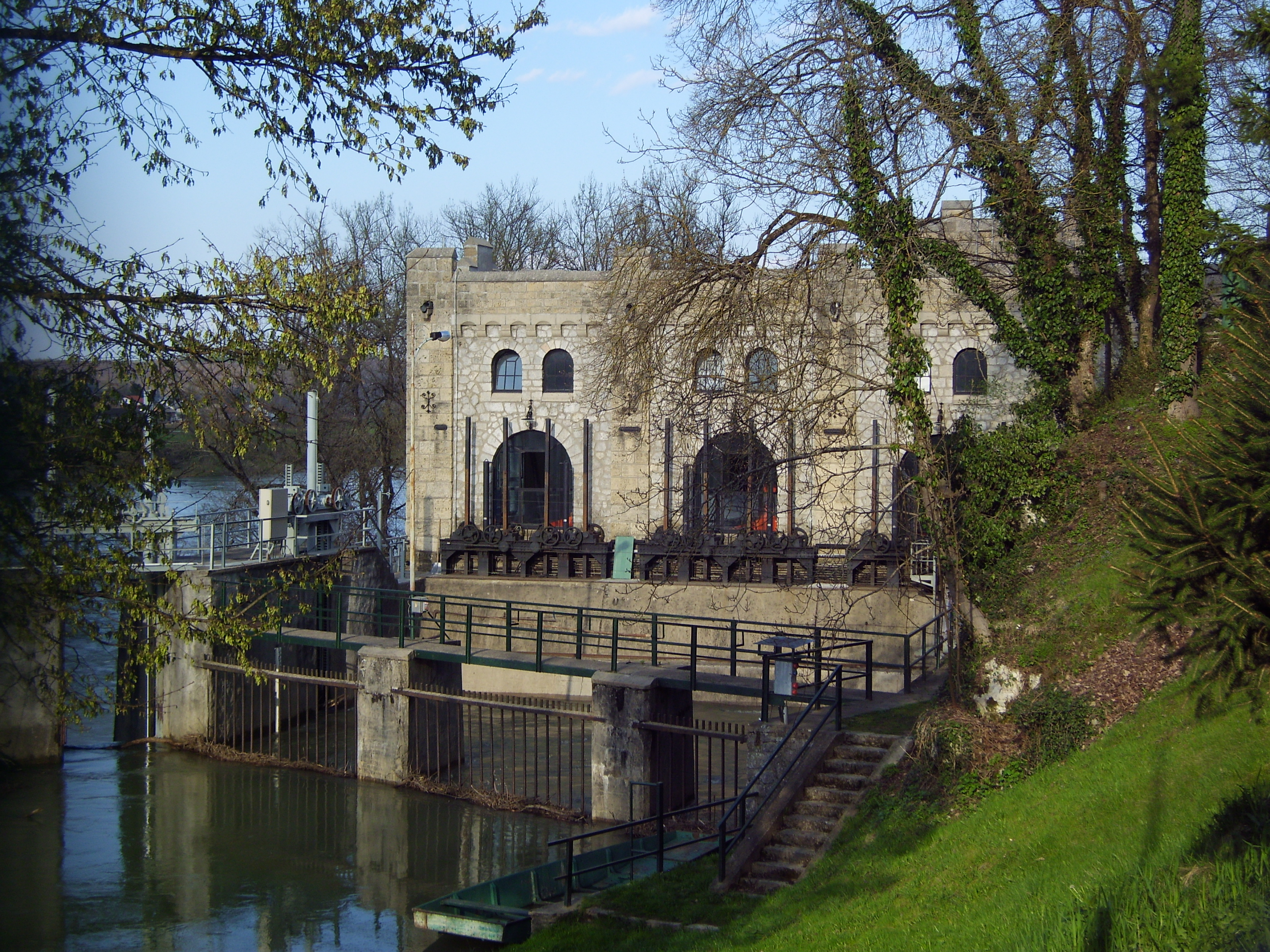
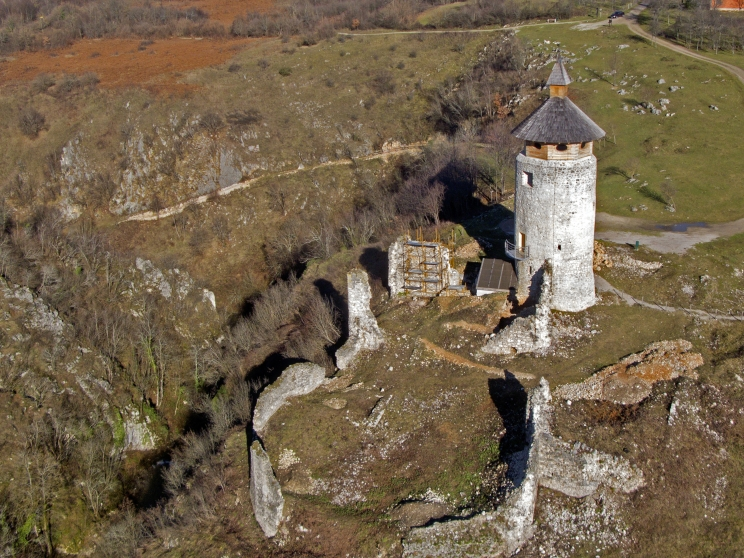

- Flag Coat of arms

- Karlovac County within Croatia
- Country: Croatia
- County seat: Karlovac

Government
  - Župan (Prefect): Martina Furdek-Hajdin (HDZ)

Area
  - Total: 3,626 km^{2} (1,400 sq mi)

Population (2021)
  - Total: 112,195
  - Density: 30.94/km^{2} (80.14/sq mi)
- Area code: 047
- ISO 3166 code: HR-04
- HDI (2022): 0.850 very high · 12th
- Website: http://www.kazup.hr/

Karlovac County (Croatian: Karlovačka županija) is a county in central Croatia, with the administrative center in Karlovac. It borders Bosnia and Herzegovina and Slovenia.

The city of Karlovac is a fort from the times of the Military Frontier with the Ottoman Empire. It was built as a six-side star fort in the 16th century at the point of confluence of four rivers. The town blossomed in the 18th and 19th centuries after being made a free town, with the development of roads between Pannonian Basin to the Adriatic Sea, and waterways along the Kupa river. The city is making use of its crucial geostrategic point in Croatia.

The county itself extends towards the north to the water springs of Jamnica, and towards the south all the way down to the mountainous regions of Gorski Kotar and Lika, in particular to the Bjelolasica mountain which features the largest winter sport recreation center in the country.

County day is celebrated on the 25 April. Patron saint of the County is Saint Joseph, who is also patron of Karlovac.

== Administrative division ==
Karlovac County is divided:

- City of Karlovac (county seat)
- City of Ogulin
- Town of Duga Resa
- Town of Ozalj
- Town of Slunj
- Municipality of Barilović
- Municipality of Bosiljevo
- Municipality of Cetingrad
- Municipality of Draganić
- Municipality of Generalski Stol
- Municipality of Josipdol
- Municipality of Kamanje
- Municipality of Krnjak
- Municipality of Lasinja
- Municipality of Netretić
- Municipality of Plaški
- Municipality of Rakovica
- Municipality of Ribnik
- Municipality of Saborsko
- Municipality of Tounj
- Municipality of Vojnić
- Municipality of Žakanje

== Demographics ==
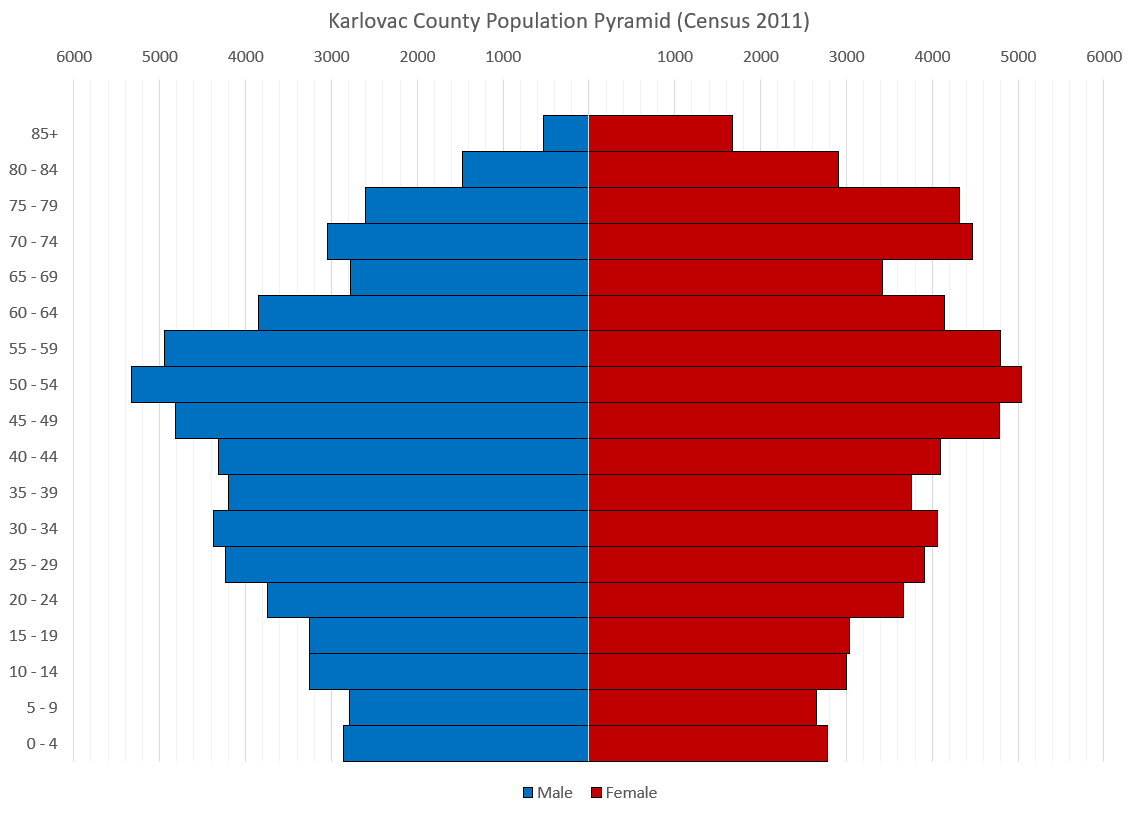
Population pyramid of Karlovac County per 2011 Census.

Historical populations of Karlovac County

Year	Pop.	±%
1857	165,697	—
1869	175,170	+5.7%
1880	172,220	−1.7%
1890	188,904	+9.7%
1900	194,294	+2.9%
1910	197,959	+1.9%
1921	188,824	−4.6%
1931	213,633	+13.1%
1948	194,643	−8.9%

Year	Pop.	±%
1953	201,748	+3.7%
1961	202,431	+0.3%
1971	195,096	−3.6%
1981	186,169	−4.6%
1991	184,577	−0.9%
2001	141,787	−23.2%
2011	128,899	−9.1%
2021	112,195	−13.0%

Source: Naselja i stanovništvo Republike Hrvatske 1857–2001, Croatian Bureau of Statistics, Zagreb, 2005

As of the 2011 census, the county had 128,899 residents. The population density is 36 people per km^{2}.

Ethnic Croats form the majority with 86.1% of the population, followed by Serbs at 10.4%.

Karlovac County: Population trends 1857–2021
v

population	165697	175170	172220	188904	194294	197959	188824	213633	194643	201748	202431	195096	186169	184577	141787	128899	112596
	1857	1869	1880	1890	1900	1910	1921	1931	1948	1953	1961	1971	1981	1991	2001	2011	2021

Sources: Croatian Bureau of Statistics publications

== County government ==
The current Prefect of Karlovac County is Martina Furdek-Hajdin (HDZ).

The county assembly is composed of 37 representatives from the following political parties:

Political party	Seats won	Government
Croatian Democratic Union	20 / 37	Government
Social Democratic Party of Croatia	8 / 37	Opposition
Homeland Movement	4 / 37	Opposition
We Can!	2 / 37	Opposition
Croatian Social Liberal Party	1 / 37	Government
New Left	1 / 37	Opposition

== See also ==
- Serbian Orthodox Eparchy of Gornji Karlovac
- Modruš-Rijeka County of the Kingdom of Croatia-Slavonia
- List of people from Karlovac County
