= List of prefects of Karlovac County =

This is a list of prefects of Karlovac County.

== Prefects of Karlovac County (1993–present) ==
Croatian Democratic Union (HDZ)

№	Portrait	Name (Born–Died)	Term of Office		Party
1		Josip Jakovčić (1952–)	4 May 1993	5 June 1997	HDZ
2		Vlado Jelkovac (1961–)	5 June 1997	27 June 2004	HDZ
3		Nedjeljko Strikić (1961–)	27 June 2004	29 June 2005	HDZ
4		Ivica Horvat (1963–)	29 June 2005	3 June 2009	HDZ
5		Ivan Vučić (1954–)	3 June 2009	1 June 2017	HDZ
6		Damir Jelić (1972–)	1 June 2017	31 August 2020	HDZ
7		Martina Furdek-Hajdin (1972–)	31 August 2020	Incumbent	HDZ

== See also ==
- Karlovac County
