= Gari Cappelli =

Croatian politician (born 1961)

Minister of Tourism
- In office 19 October 2016 – 23 July 2020
- Prime Minister: Andrej Plenković
- Preceded by: Anton Kliman
- Succeeded by: Nikolina Brnjac (Minister of Tourism and Sports)

Mayor of Mali Lošinj
- In office 2005–2016
- Preceded by: Dragan Balija
- Succeeded by: Ana Kučić

Personal details
- Born: 16 May 1961 (age 65) Mali Lošinj, PR Croatia, FPR Yugoslavia
- Citizenship: Croatian
- Party: Croatian Democratic Union
- Education: University of Rijeka

Gari Cappelli (born 16 May 1961) is a Croatian politician who had served as the Minister of Tourism in the Cabinet of Andrej Plenković from 2016 to 2020. He also served as mayor of Mali Lošinj between 2005 and 2016.

== Early life ==
Cappelli was born on 16 May 1961 in Mali Lošinj in a family with origins from Padua, Italy.

== Political career ==
Cappelli joined HDZ in 1992 and soon became the head of Mali Lošinj's HDZ town committee and started work in the county party committee. In 1999, due to his perfect knowledge of the Italian language, he was posted at the Croatian Consulate General in the Italian city of Trieste, where he was in charge of economic co-operation.

In 2005, Cappelli is running for Mayor of Mali Lošinj and has been performing for the third term for this position.

From 19 October 2016 to 23 July 2020, Cappelli served as the 13th Minister of Tourism, in the Cabinet of Andrej Plenković. He succeeded Anton Kliman.
