= Tonči Glavina =

Croatian politician (born 1980)

Minister of Tourism and Sports
- Incumbent
- Assumed office 17 May 2024
- Prime Minister: Andrej Plenković
- Preceded by: Nikolina Brnjac

Personal details
- Born: 30 December 1980 (age 45) Split, SR Croatia, SFR Yugoslavia (modern Croatia)
- Party: Croatian Democratic Union

Tonči Glavina (born 30 December 1980) is a Croatian politician of the Croatian Democratic Union serving as minister of tourism and sports since 2024. From 2017 to 2024, he served as a state secretary of the Ministry of Tourism and Sports.
