= Vjekoslav Karas =

Croatian painter (1821–1858)

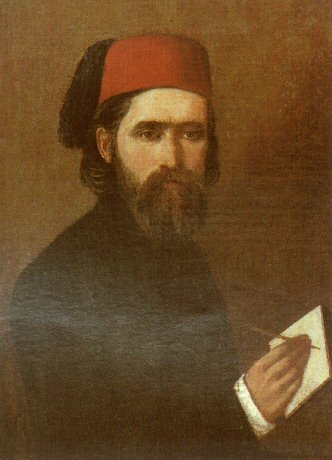
- Self-portrait, c. 1850s
- Born: 19 May 1821; Karlovac, Austrian Empire, (now Croatia)
- Died: 5 July 1858 (aged 37); Karlovac, Kingdom of Croatia and Slavonia, Austrian Empire, (now Croatia)
- Known for: Painting; drawing
- Notable work: Roman woman with a lute (c. 1845-1847)

Vjekoslav Karas (19 May 1821 - 5 July 1858) was a Croatian painter, considered a pioneer of a new era of Croatian painting and art in general.

== Life ==
Born in Karlovac, Croatia, Karas was sent to be educated in Italy in 1838. While in Rome, he drew inspiration from biblical and religious themes, painting Mother with Moses on the river bank. While in Italy he developed a love for music and learned to play the flute and the guitar while composing songs in both Italian and Croatian. He began focusing his craft on portraits, painting Roman woman with a lute and Roman commoner before returning to Karlovac in 1848. Upon his return, he continued painting portraits and began painting local country life and local folk. He moved to Zagreb and began teaching. From 1851-1852 he traveled to Bosnia where he painted a portrait of Ottoman field marshal and governor Omer-paša Latas and his daughter.

Karas suffered periodically from depression and had even attempted suicide. He briefly stayed with bishop Josip Juraj Strossmayer in Đakovo, but left soon after his suicide attempt. Still suffering from depression and living in poverty, Karas committed suicide by drowning in the Korana river in his native Karlovac.

== Gallery ==
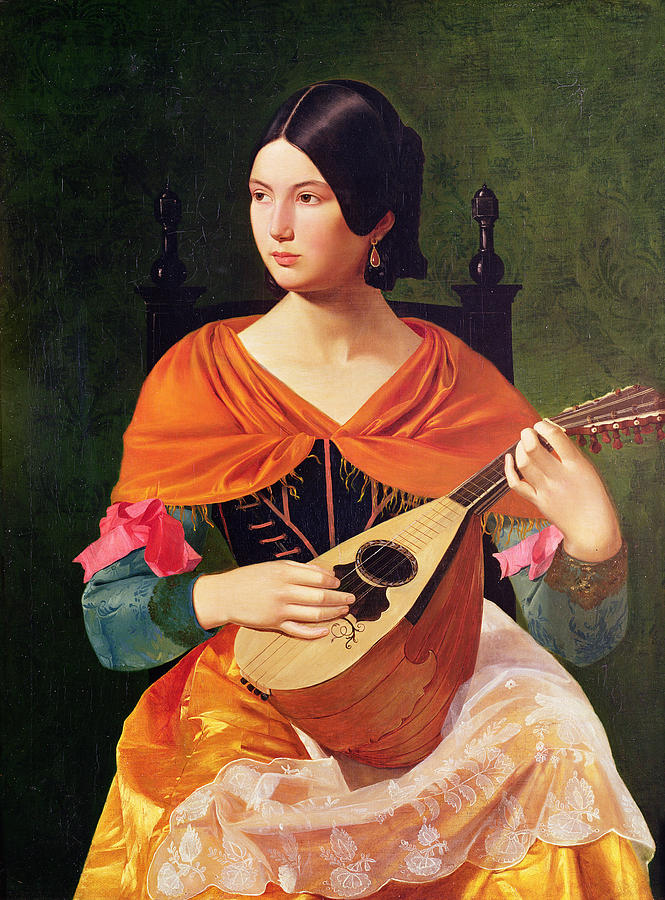
Roman woman with a lute, Croatian History Museum, Zagreb

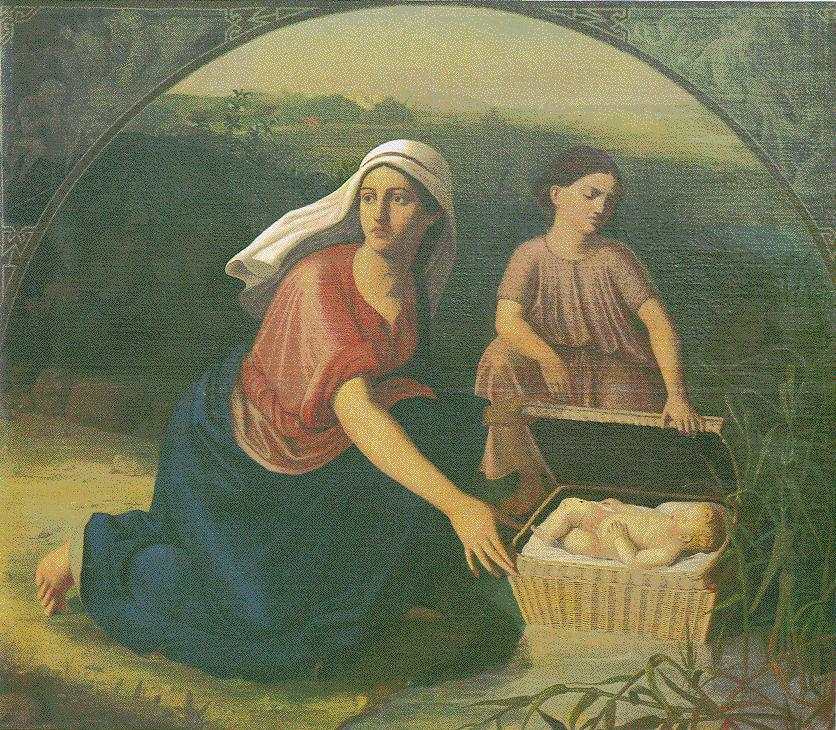
Mother with Moses on the river bank

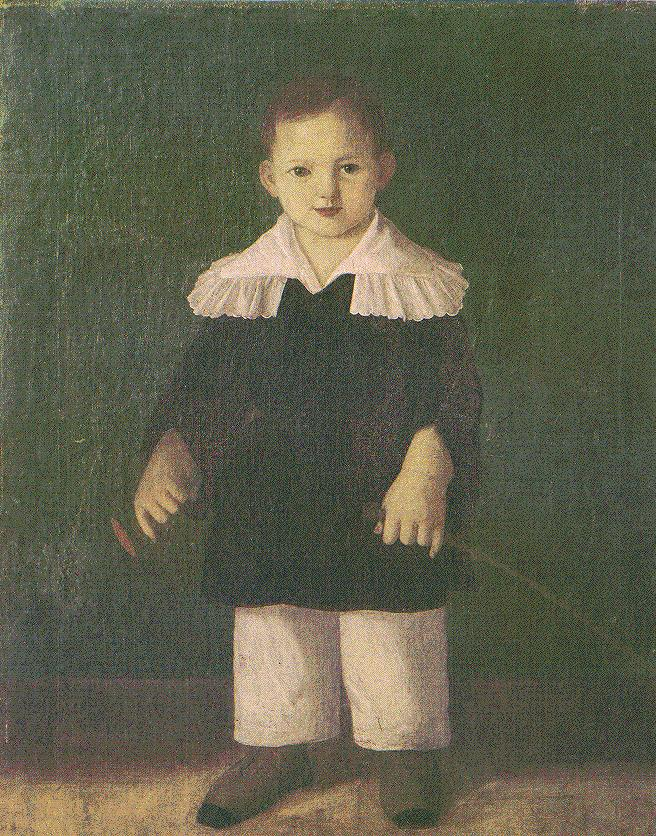
Child

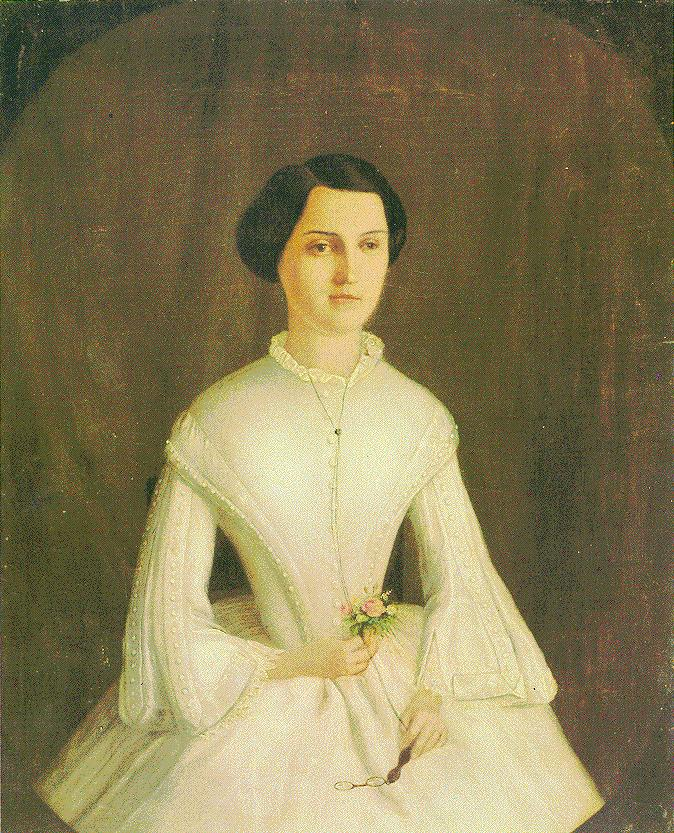
Portrait of Josefine Barac

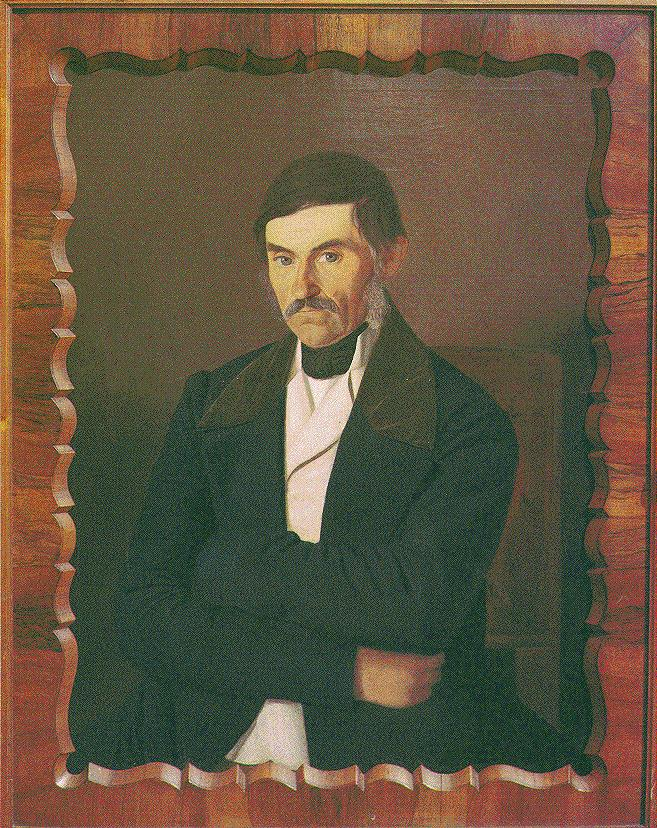
Portrait of Miško Krešić

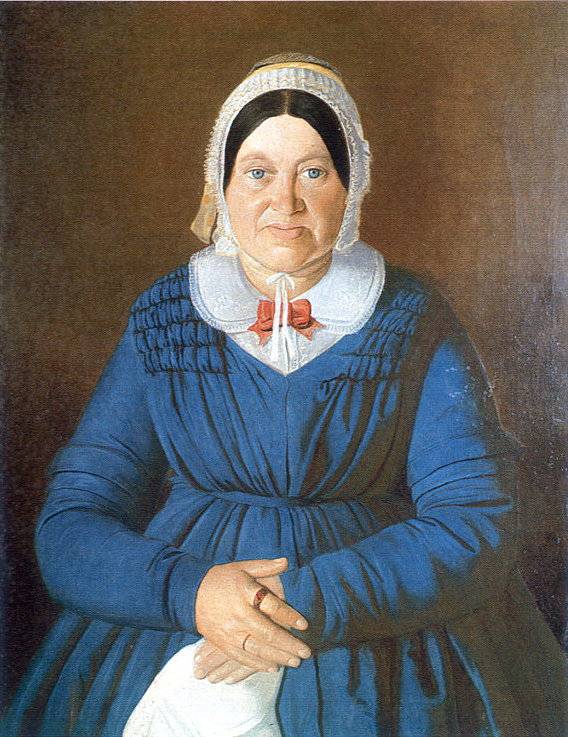
Portrait of Ana Krešić

== Sources ==
- Bulat-Simić, Anka (1948). Vjekoslav Karas. Društvo historičara umjetnosti NRH.
