= Brnjac, Serbia =

Brnjac Брњац (Serbian)
- Village (Selo)
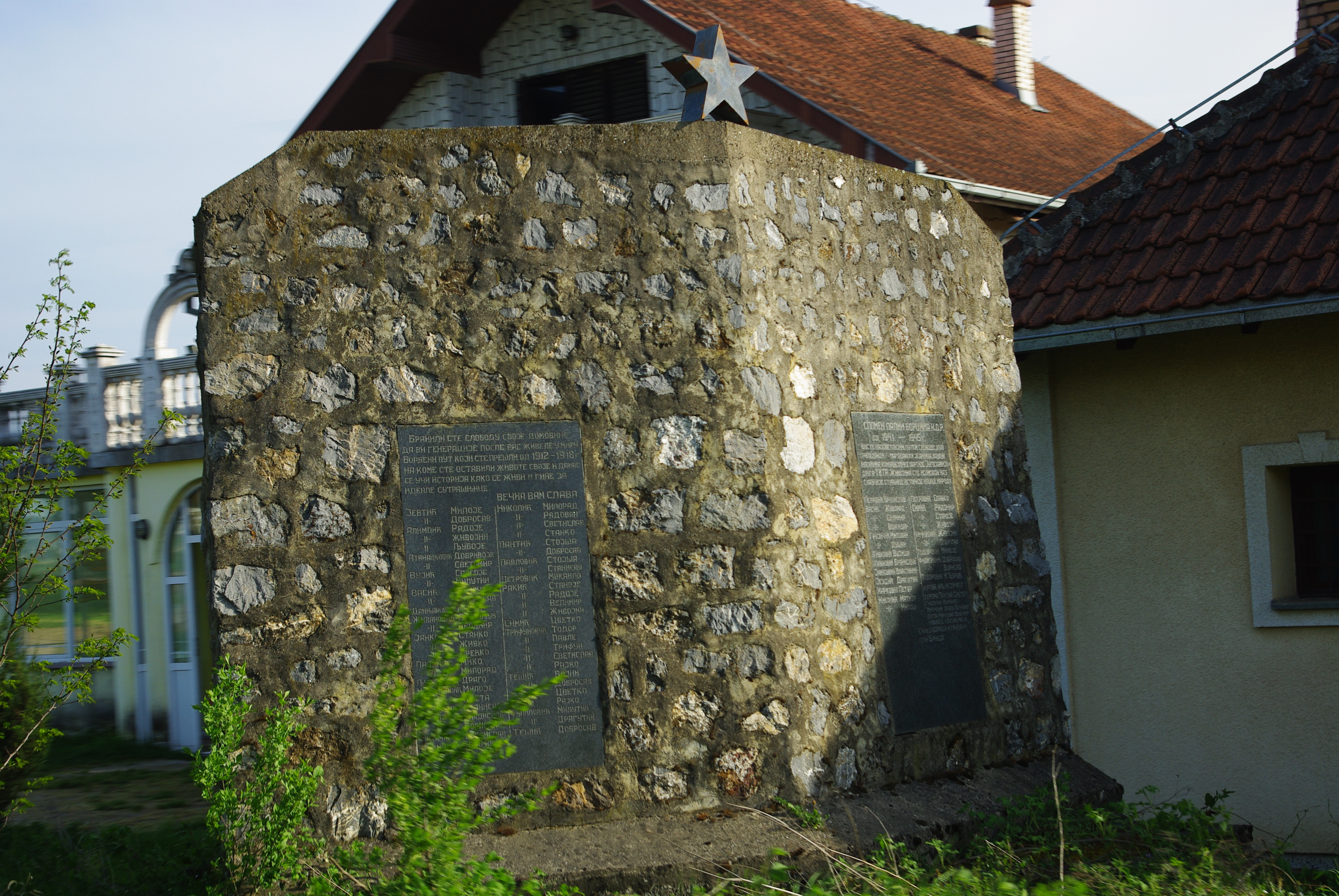
- Monument at Brnjac

- Location within Serbia
- Coordinates: 44°32′52″N 19°22′03″E
- Country: Serbia
- Time zone: UTC+1 (CET)
  - Summer (DST): UTC+2 (CEST)

Brnjac (Serbian: Брњац) is a settlement near the Serbian city of Loznica in the Mačva District. It has a population of 631.
