= Carla Martinis =

Croatian operatic soprano (1922–2010)

- Carla Martinis (photo with 1951 dedication)
- Occupation: soprano opera singer

Carla Martinis (19 January 1922 – 9 August 2010) was a Croatian operatic soprano particularly associated with the Italian repertoire.

== Biography ==
Carla (Dragica) Martinis was born in the village of Danculovice (near Ozalj and Jastrebarsko) and studied at the Zagreb Music Conservatory with Marija Kostrenčić and Vicko Martinis, the latter of whom she married in 1942. She made her debut that same year at the Zagreb Opera House, singing the role of Mimi in La bohème. She then sang at the Prague National Theatre for a time. In 1949, she won the Geneva International Singing Competition.

Martinis went on to sing at the New York City Opera from 1950 until 1953. The year 1950 also saw her debut at the Vienna State Opera, where she would sing regularly until 1962 to considerable acclaim. In 1951, she appeared at the Salzburg Festival as Desdemona in Otello, under Wilhelm Furtwängler.

The year 1952 saw her debut at the Palais Garnier, the Aix-en-Provence Festival, the Deutsche Oper Berlin, at La Scala in Milan, and the Teatro San Carlo in Naples in 1953. She then appeared at the San Francisco Opera in 1954.

Carla Martinis was particularly admired in Verdi roles such as Amelia, Leonora, Elisabetta, Aida, Desdemona, and Puccini roles, Manon Lescaut, Mimi, Tosca, Cio Cio San, Turandot. Other notable roles included, Gioconda, Maddalena, Donna Anna, Antonia.

She was made Kammersängerin in 1955. Sadly, family reasons forced her to retire in the 1960s, while still at the height of her powers. She died in Vienna.

== Recordings ==
- 1951 – Otello – Carla Martinis, Ramón Vinay, Paul Schöffler, Anton Dermota, Sieglinde Wagner, Josef Greindl, Wiener Staatsopernchor, Vienna Philharmonic Orchestra, Wilhelm Furtwängler, recorded live at the Salzburg Festival (EMI)
- 1952 – La forza del destino – Carla Martinis, Rudolf Schock, Josef Metternich, Martha Mödl, Gottlob Frick, Gustav Neidlinger – Chorus and orchestra of Radio Hamburg, Hans Schmidt-Isserstedt (Walhall Eternity Series)
- 1953 – Tosca – Carla Martinis, Rudolf Schock, Josef Metternich – Chorus and orchestra of Radio Hamburg, Wilhelm Schüchter (Walhall Eternity Series)
