= Dragojla Jarnević =

Croatian poet and teacher

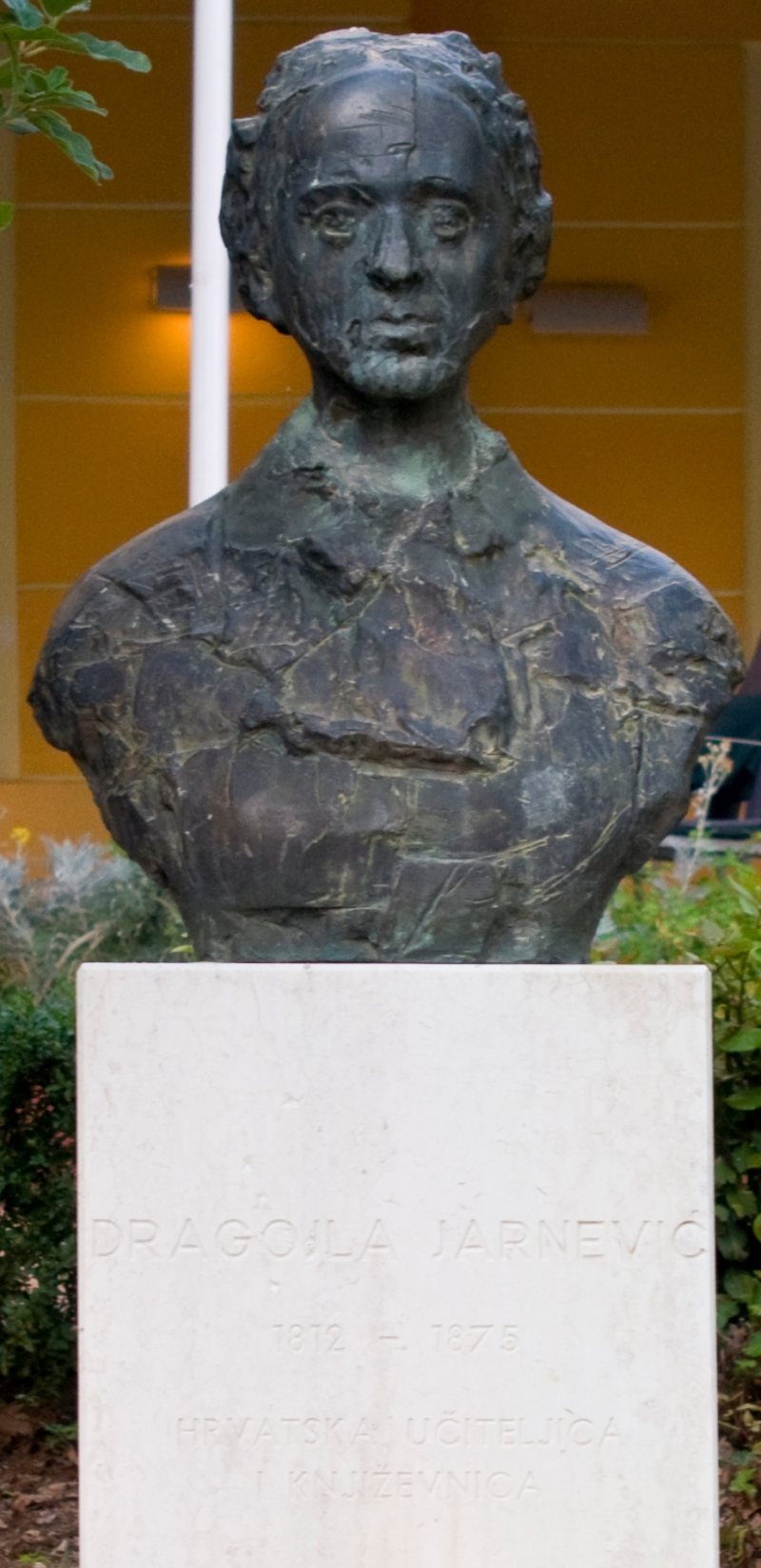
A bust of Dragojla Jarnević in Crikvenica

Dragojla Jarnević (also spelled Jarnjević), (4 January 1812 in Karlovac – 12 March 1875 in Karlovac) was a Croatian poet and teacher. She became a member of the Illyrian movement, being most famous for writing of women's rights issues. She is also known for being an early mountaineer and rock climber, who was famous for scaling the rock of Okić (stijena Okića).
