= Roza Miletić =

Croatian soldier (1934–2021)

Roza Miletić (1934 – 22 February 2021), better known as Teta Roza was a Croatian veteran of the Croatian War of Independence known for capturing a tank and a Yugoslav pilot.

Miletić was born in Rastoke near Slunj. Her mother left her and her father was killed by the Yugoslav Partisans while serving as a Nazi collaborationist Croatian Home Guard during World War II. Her husband was an alcoholic and she had a difficult time raising her six children.

When the Croatian War of Independence broke out her daughter worked as an army nurse in Vukovar hospital and her five sons were enlisted in the Croatian Army scattered around Croatian fronts. Roza also joined the Croatian Army soon after the war started, as a member of the 110th Slunj battalion of the Karlovac brigade, as she lived in the village of Kamenica at the front lines.

On 8 November 1991 she captured a colonel of the Yugoslav Air Force, Stevan Janjanin. Janjanin ejected from his plane that was shot down, and as he was approached by Croatian soldiers on the ground, wounded and unarmed, Miletić intervened by treating him as her prisoner of war, saving his life. She later said that her own father's war-time death influenced her to do so.

In another incident, Miletić's actions enabled the capture of a Yugoslav tank. After failing to counter the tank with rifle fire, she found a large barrel and banged on it, which produced a loud sound similar to artillery fire, scaring the tank crew and causing them to flee.

Miletić has been decorated twice, with the Homeland War Memorial Medal and the Medal for Participation in Operation "Storm".

In 2001, a Croatian author wrote a book about her adventures, titled Žena koja je zarobila neprijateljski tenk (A woman who captured an enemy tank).

Miletić died on 22 February 2021, at the age of 87.
