= Boris Mutić =

Croatian journalist

Boris Mutić (October 31, 1939 – March 16, 2009) was a Croatian sports reporter, working for Croatian national television (HRT).

Mutić had started his career as a professional sports journalist in 1966. He reported from six summer and seven winter Olympic Games, six World Cup Finals, and dozens of World and European Championships in different sports.

In 2004 Mutić received a special award from the Croatian Olympic Committee.
