= Alfred Freddy Krupa =

Croatian artist

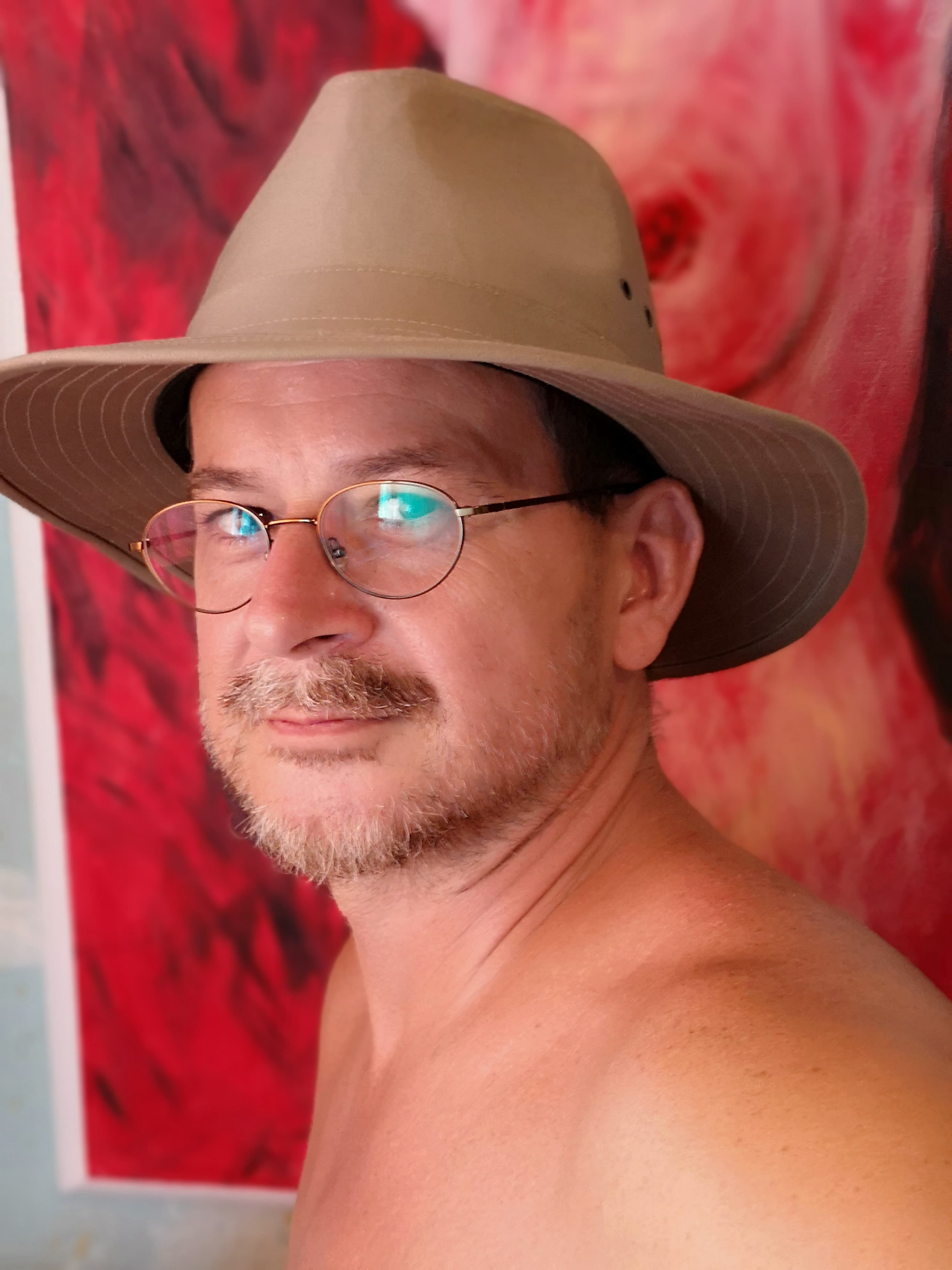
- Alfred Freddy Krupa
- Born: Alfred Krupa; 14 June 1971 (age 55); Karlovac, Yugoslavia

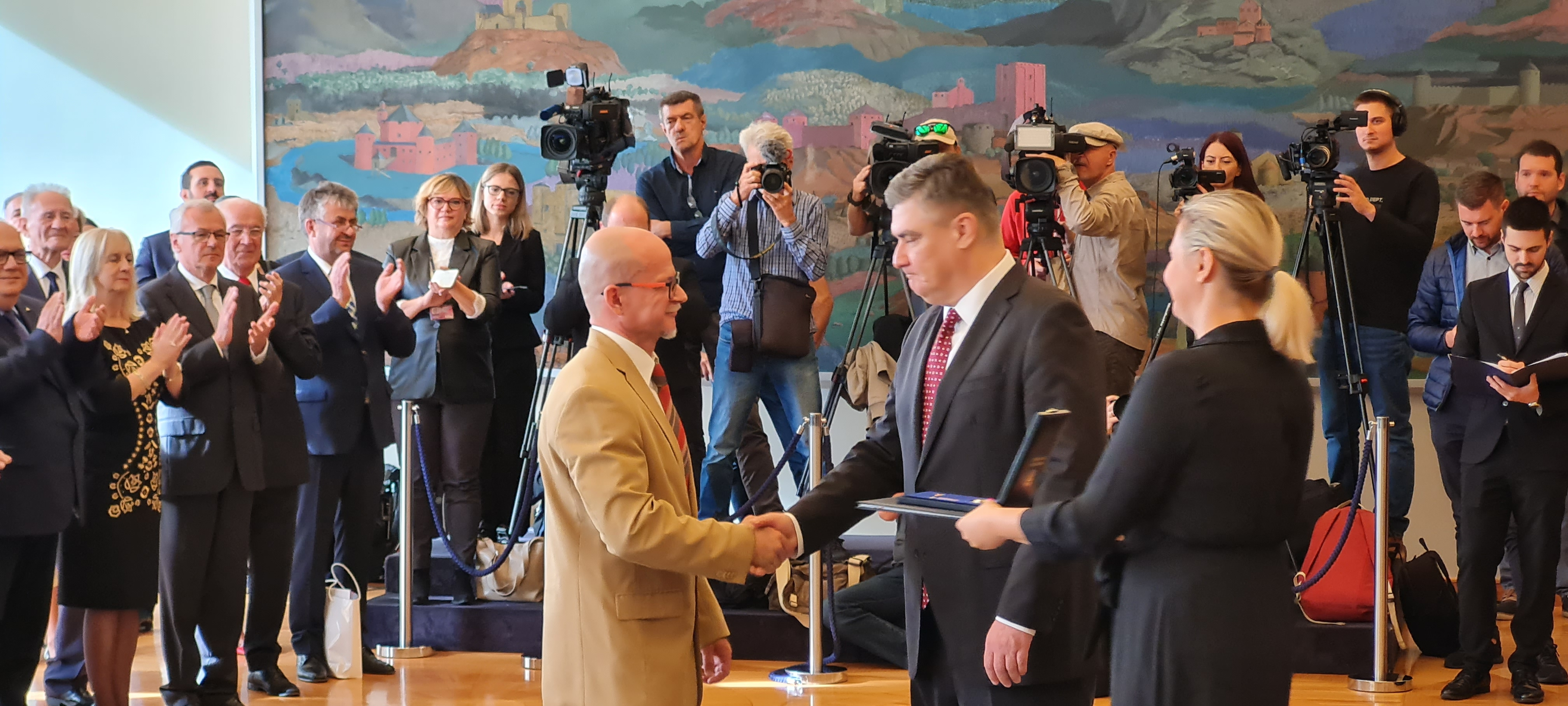
President of the Republic of Croatia Zoran Milanović is shaking hands with the painter Alfred F. Krupa on the occasion of awarding him with the Order of Danica Hrvatska with the image of Marko Marulić, October 25, 2023

Alfred Freddy Krupa (14 June 1971, Karlovac, Yugoslavia) is a Croatian painter and book illustrator.

== Career ==
He graduated from the University of Zagreb Academy of Fine Arts in 1995. He published New Ink Art Manifesto in 1996 and departed to Tokyo Gakugei University in 1998.

He became well known to the general public in 1990 via the then popular Yugoslav weekly "Vikend/Weekend". Author Milica Jović wrote in her article for New York-based Highlark Magazine that Krupa is considered the pivotal figure in the Western New Ink Art movement. He got the award of the Order of Danica Hrvatska on April 26, 2023 and The City of Karlovac Award on the 13th July 2023.

Art Market Magazine reported that Alfred Freddy Krupa’s works entered the collection of the Museum of Modern Art (MoMA). The London Art Biennale website notes that in 2025, A boxer who never leaves the ring was included in the exhibition.
