= Nikolina Ilijanić =

Croatian basketball player

Personal information
- Born: 16 November 1983 (age 42) Karlovac, SFR Yugoslavia
- Listed height: 1.65 m (5 ft 5 in)

Career information
- WNBA draft: 2005: undrafted
- Position: Point guard / shooting guard

Career history
- Agram Zagreb
- 2009–2014: Croatia Zagreb

Nikolina Ilijanić (born 16 November 1983) is a Croatian female basketball player.
