= Ministry of Tourism and Sports (Croatia) =

Ministry of the Croatian government

Ministry of Tourism and Sport Ministarstvo turizma i sporta
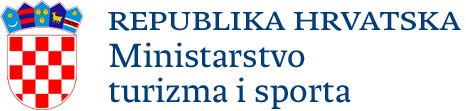

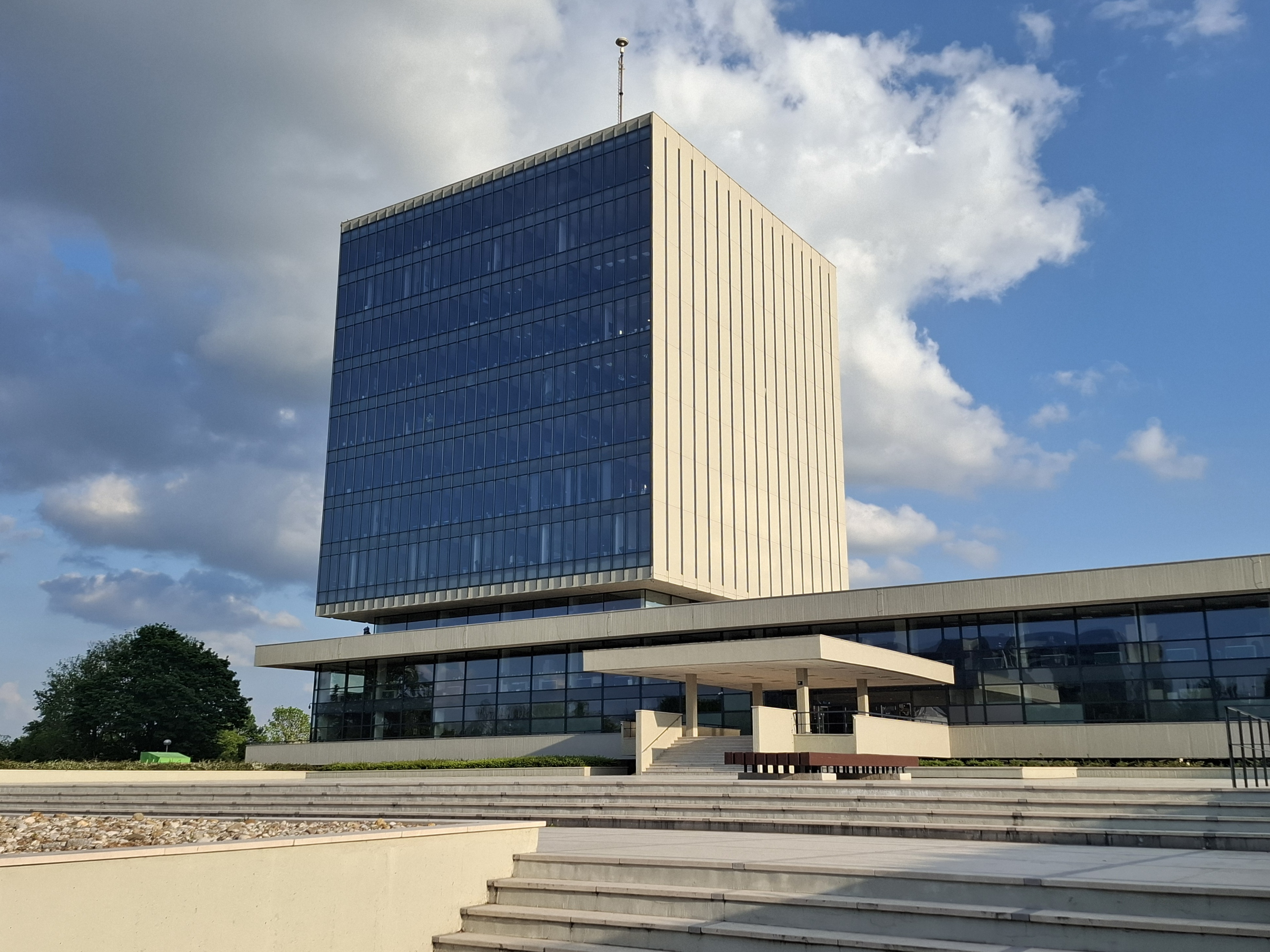
- The Kockica building, headquarters of the Ministry

Ministry overview
- Formed: 31 May 1990; 36 years ago
- Type: Ministry in the Government of Croatia
- Jurisdiction: Croatia
- Headquarters: Prisavlje 14, Zagreb, Croatia
- Employees: 320 (2025 estimate)
- Budget: €449.1 million (2026 budget)
- Website: mint.gov.hr

Minister
- Currently: Tonči Glavina since 17 May 2024

The Ministry of Tourism and Sports of the Republic of Croatia (Croatian: Ministarstvo turizma i sporta) is the ministry in the Government of Croatia which in charge of the development of tourism.

== List of ministers ==
The following officials held the post of tourism ministers in Croatian cabinets since 1990. Unless otherwise noted, the ministry only included the tourism portfolio.

#	Minister	Party	Term start	Term end	Days in office	Cabinet(s)
1	Janko Vranyczany-Dobrinović	HDZ	25 July 1990	17 July 1991	357	Mesić Manolić
2	Anton Marčelo Popović	HDZ	16 September 1991	12 August 1992	331	Gregurić
3	Branko Mikša ^{[nb 1]}	HDZ	12 August 1992	3 April 1993	234	Šarinić
4	Niko Bulić ^{[nb 2]}	HDZ	3 April 1993	11 September 1997	1,622	Valentić Mateša
5	Sergej Morsan	HDZ	9 November 1997	15 April 1999	522	Mateša
6	Ivan Herak	HDZ	15 April 1999	27 January 2000	287	Mateša
7	Pave Župan-Rusković	SDP	27 January 2000	23 December 2003	1,426	Račan I Račan II
8	Božidar Kalmeta ^{[nb 3]}	HDZ	23 December 2003	12 January 2008	1,481	Sanader I
9	Damir Bajs	HSS	12 January 2008	23 December 2011	1,441	Sanader II Kosor
10	Veljko Ostojić	IDS	23 December 2011	9 March 2013	442	Milanović
11	Darko Lorencin	IDS	19 March 2013	22 January 2016	1,039	Milanović
12	Anton Kliman	HDZ	22 January 2016	19 October 2016	271	Orešković
13	Gari Cappelli	HDZ	19 October 2016	23 July 2020	1,373	Plenković I

=== Notes ===
nb 1. As Minister of Tourism and Trade
nb 2. As Minister of Tourism and Trade (3 April 1993 – 20 May 1993); as Minister of Tourism (20 May 1993 – 11 September 1997)
nb 3. As Minister of the Sea, Tourism, Transport and Development

=== Ministers of Tourism and Sports (2020–present) ===
#	Minister	Party	Term start	Term end	Days in office	Cabinet(s)
1	Nikolina Brnjac	HDZ	23 July 2020	17 May 2024	1,394	Plenković II
2	Tonči Glavina	HDZ	17 May 2024	Incumbent	809	Plenković III
