= Nikolina Brnjac =

Croatian politician (born 1978)

Nikolina Brnjac MEP
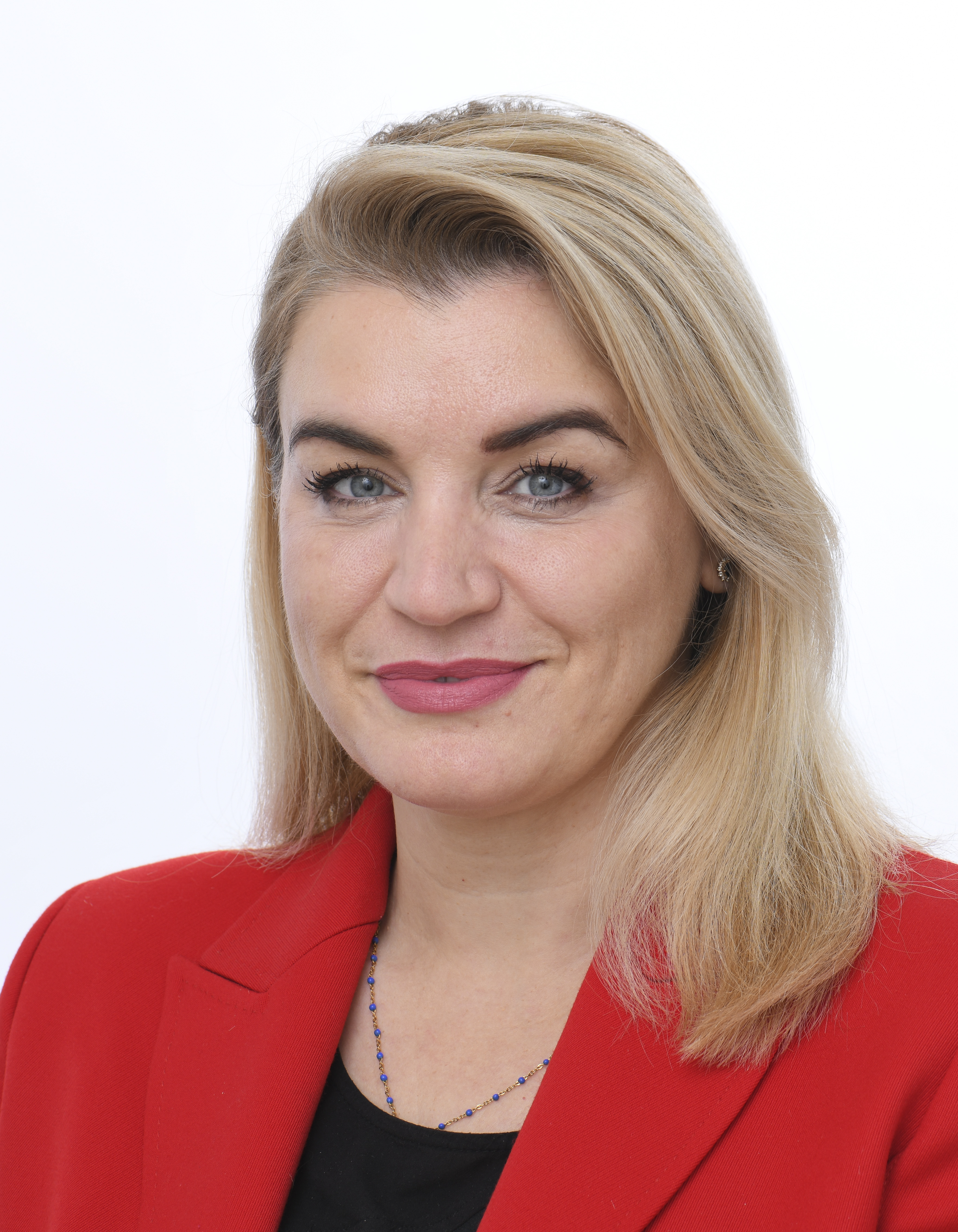
- Brnjac in 2024

Member of the European Parliament for Croatia
- Incumbent
- Assumed office 16 July 2024

Minister of Tourism and Sports
- In office 23 July 2020 – 17 May 2024
- Prime Minister: Andrej Plenković
- Preceded by: Gari Cappelli
- Succeeded by: Tonči Glavina

Personal details
- Born: 11 July 1978 (age 48) Karlovac, SR Croatia, SFR Yugoslavia (modern Croatia)
- Party: Croatian; Croatian Democratic Union (2016–present); EU; European People's Party
- Spouse: Goran Brnjac
- Children: 2
- Education: University of Zagreb

Nikolina Brnjac (born 11 July 1978) is a Croatian politician of the Croatian Democratic Union (HDZ) who has been serving as a Member of the European Parliament for Croatia since 2024. She served as Minister of Tourism and Sports from 2020 to 2024 in the Plenković II Cabinet.

== Early life and education ==
Brnjac was born in Karlovac. She graduated at the Faculty of Transport and Traffic Sciences, University of Zagreb and earned the title of Doctor of Science in Transport and Traffic Technology in 2009. From 2002 to 2010, she worked as an assistant lecturer at the Faculty, until she became head of the Intermodal Transport Department, from 2010 to 2017.

== Political career ==
Brnjac became a member of the Croatian Democratic Union (HDZ) in 2016. From 2017 to 2019, she served as the State Secretary for Transport in the Ministry of the Sea, Transport, and Infrastructure. She was a candidate of the HDZ at the 2019 European Parliament election, but didn't win a seat.

During the Croatian presidency of the Council of the European Union in 2020, Brnjac held the position of State Secretary in the Ministry of Foreign and European Affairs. She was a candidate at the 2020 parliamentary election for the Electoral district VII, but she didn't win a seat.

Andrej Plenković named her Minister of Tourism and Sports in his Second Cabinet on 23 July 2020. She won a seat at the 2024 European Parliament election. In the European Parliament she is a member of the Committee on Transport and Tourism and a substitute on the Committee on Regional Development.

== See also ==
- Cabinet of Andrej Plenković II
