= Šunjić =

Šunjić is a Croatian surname. Notable people with the surname include:

- Davor Šunjić (born 1980), former Croatian handball player
- Ivan Šunjić (born 1996), Croatian football player
- Marijan Šunjić (disambiguation), multiple people
- Toni Šunjić (born 1988), Bosnian football player
