= Mario Nobilo =

Croatian politician and diplomat

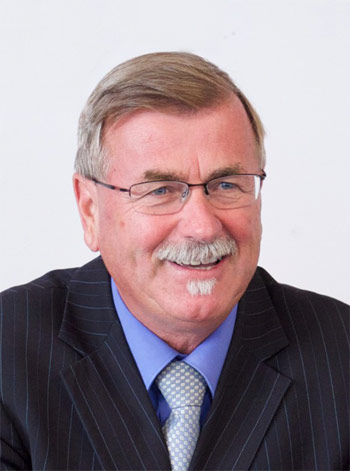
- Nobilo in 2017

Croatian Representative to NATO
- In office 5 September 2017 – 3 July 2025

Ambassador to Belgium
- In office September 2012 – 5 September 2017

Ambassador to Slovenia
- In office 2004–2008

Permanent Representative of Croatia to the United Nations
- In office 14 September 1992 – 18 February 1997
- Preceded by: Zvonimir Šeparović
- Succeeded by: Ivan Šimonović

Personal details
- Born: Mario Nobilo; 15 June 1952 (age 74) Lumbarda, Croatia, Yugoslavia

Mario Nobilo (born 15 June 1952) is a Croatian politician and diplomat who served as the Croatian Representative at NATO from 5 September 2017 to 3 July 2025.

He served as the representative to the United Nations from 1992 to 1997.

From 2004 to 2008, Nobilo served as the Ambassador to Slovenia. He was the Ambassador to Belgium from 2012 to 2017. He was appointed on 25 August 2017 and sworn into office on 5 September.
