= Dražen Bošnjaković =

Croatian politician

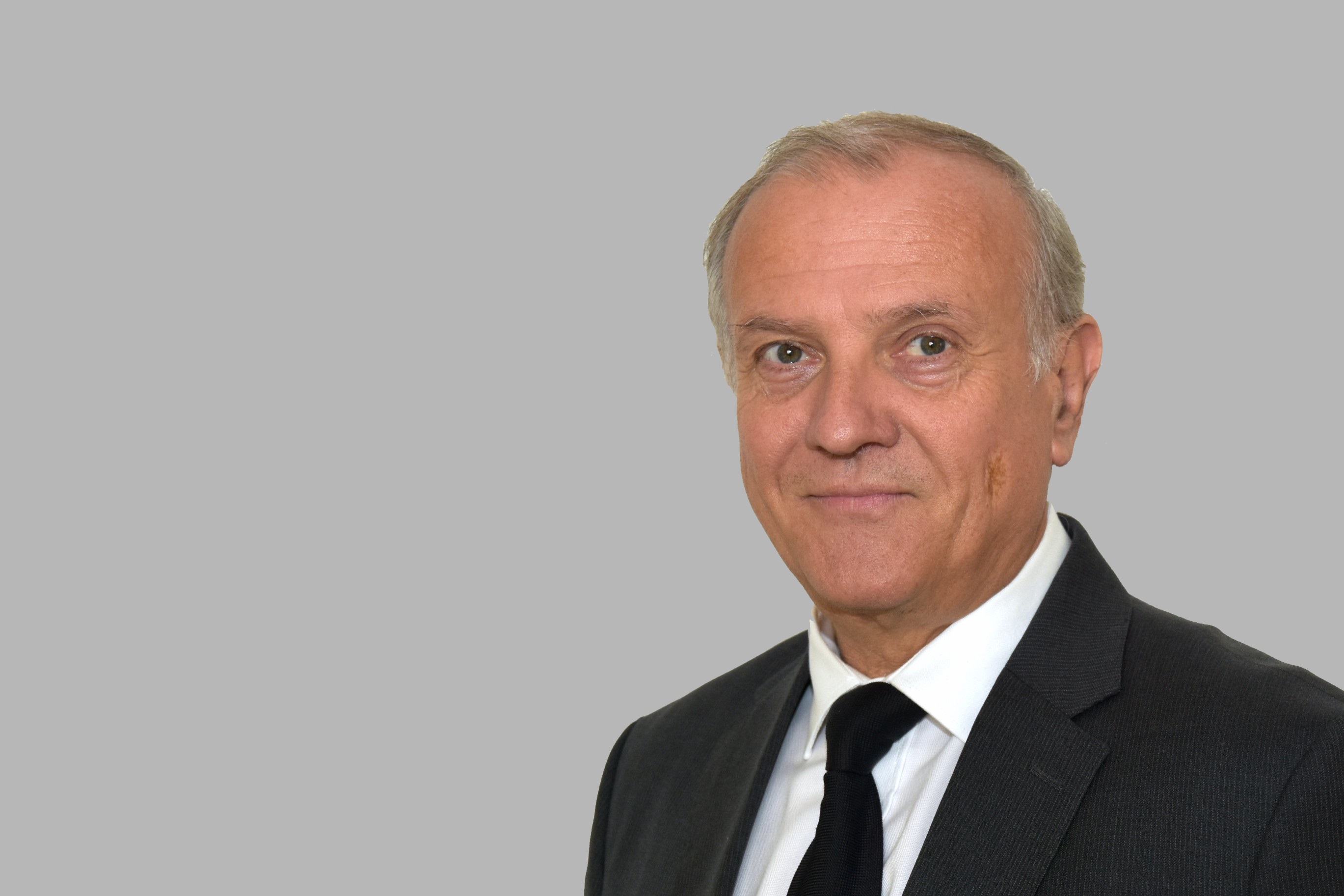

Justice of the Constitutional Court of Croatia
- Incumbent
- Assumed office 7 December 2024

Minister of Justice
- In office 9 June 2017 – 23 July 2020
- Prime Minister: Andrej Plenković
- Preceded by: Ante Šprlje
- Succeeded by: Ivan Malenica (Minister of Public Administration and Justice)
- In office 7 July 2010 – 23 December 2011
- Prime Minister: Jadranka Kosor
- Preceded by: Ivan Šimonović
- Succeeded by: Orsat Miljenić

Member of the Croatian Parliament
- In office 23 December 2003 – 20 February 2008
- Prime Minister: Ivo Sanader
- In office 28 December 2015 – 9 June 2017
- Prime Minister: Zoran Milanović; Tihomir Orešković
- In office 22 July 2020 – 16 May 2024
- Prime Minister: Andrej Plenković

Personal details
- Born: 6 January 1961 (age 65) Vukovar, PR Croatia, FPR Yugoslavia (modern Croatia)
- Party: Croatian Democratic Union
- Children: 3
- Education: University of Zagreb

Dražen Bošnjaković (born 6 January 1961) is a Croatian lawyer and former politician who has served as a justice of the Constitutional Court of Croatia since 7 December 2024, having previously served as the Minister of Justice from 2017 to 2020.

== Early life and education ==
Bošnjaković was born in Vukovar on 6 January 1961. He lived in Ilok until he was eighteen with his grandparents. After finishing high school he attended the Faculty of Law at the University of Zagreb.

== Career ==
At the beginning of his career, Bošnjaković worked in the Council of Ivanić Grad before later serving as a secretary in Sisak-Moslavina County from 1993 to 1997. After that he started his own law firm and worked as a lawyer until entering into politics. He became a member of the Croatian Parliament on 23 December 2003, and served until 20 February 2008, where he suspended his mandate to accept the position of State Secretary in the Ministry of Justice, his seat taken by MP Stjepan Kundić. In July of 2010, he was appointed Minister of Justice, succeeding Ivan Šimonović, who had accepted the position of UN Assistant Secretary-General for Human Rights. Bošnjaković served as Minister of Justice until December of 2011. He then served as vice-president of the County Committee of HDZ of Zagreb County and member of the Central Board. In 2015, he was elected back to being MP, serving until 2016. He was reelected in 2016, and stayed in parliament until 2017, where he was reappointed Minister of Justice, with Ivan Šuker taking his seat. Bošnjaković served until July of 2020, where his term ended and was succeeded by Ivan Malencia. He was reelected to parliament that same month, serving until 16 May 2024. On 7 December, 2024, alongside nine others, he was elected as a justice for the Constitutional Court.

== Other activities ==
- Academy of European Law (ERA), Member of the Governing Board

== Personal life ==
He is married to Lidija Bošnjaković and is a father of three.
