= Permanent Representative of Croatia to the United Nations =

The permanent representative of Croatia to the United Nations is Croatia's foremost diplomatic representative to the United Nations. The position of permanent representative holds the equivalent rank to that of an ambassador and is appointed by the President of Croatia.

== List of permanent representatives of Croatia to the United Nations ==
| Incumbent | Term start | Term end | Reference |
|---|---|---|---|
| Zvonimir Šeparović | 27 May 1992 | 12 August 1992 | |
| Mario Nobilo | 12 August 1992 | 15 January 1997 | |
| Ivan Šimonović | 7 February 1997 | 8 February 2003 | |
| Vladimir Drobnjak (first term) | 1 July 2003 | 27 April 2005 | |
| Mirjana Mladineo | 1 July 2005 | 8 February 2008 | |
| Neven Jurica | 10 February 2008 | 31 August 2009 | |
| Ranko Vilović | 14 September 2009 | 31 July 2013 | |
| Vladimir Drobnjak (second term) | 1 August 2013 | 31 August 2019 | |
| Ivan Šimonović (second term) | 16 September 2019 | 28 February 2025 | |

== See also ==
- Foreign relations of Croatia
