= High resolution electron energy loss spectroscopy =

Tool used in surface science

High resolution electron energy loss spectroscopy (HREELS) is a tool used in surface science. The inelastic scattering of electrons from surfaces is utilized to study electronic excitations or vibrational modes of the surface of a material or of molecules adsorbed to a surface. In contrast to other electron energy loss spectroscopies (EELS), HREELS deals with small energy losses in the range of 10^{−3} eV to 1 eV. It plays an important role in the investigation of surface structure, catalysis, dispersion of surface phonons and the monitoring of epitaxial growth.

== Overview of HREELS ==
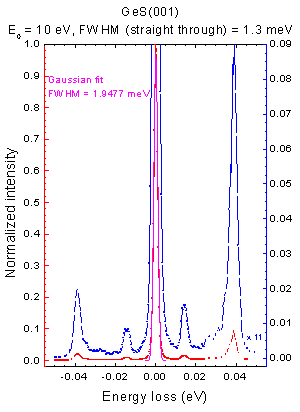
An HREELS spectrum showing surface phonons at 15 and 38 meV. The appearance of peaks on both sides of the elastic scattering peak can be understood by comparison to Raman spectroscopy.

In general, electron energy loss spectroscopy is based on the energy losses of electrons when inelastically scattered on matter. An incident beam of electrons with a known energy (E_{i}) is scattered on a sample. The scattering of these electrons can excite the electronic structure of the sample. If this is the case the scattered electron loses the specific energy (ΔE) needed to cause the excitation. Those scattering processes are called inelastic. It may be easiest to imagine that the energy loss is for example due to an excitation of an electron from an atomic K-shell to the M-shell. The energy for this excitation is taken away from the electron's kinetic energy. The energies of the scattered electrons (E_{s}) are measured and the energy loss can be calculated. From the measured data an intensity versus energy loss diagram is established. In the case of scattering by phonons the so-called energy loss can also be a gain of energy (similar to anti-Stokes Raman spectroscopy). These energy losses allow, using comparison to other experiments or theory, one to draw conclusions about surface properties of a sample.

Excitations of the surface structure are usually very low energy, ranging from 10^{−3} eV to 10 eV. In HREELS spectra electrons with only small energy losses, like also Raman scattering, the interesting features are all located very close together and especially near to the very strong elastic scattering peak. Hence EELS spectrometers require a high energy resolution. Therefore, this regime of EELS is called High Resolution EELS. In this context resolution shall be defined as the energy difference in which two features in a spectrum are just distinguishable divided by the mean energy of those features: $\Delta E / E$

In the case of EELS the first thing to think of in order to achieve high resolution is using incident electrons of a very precisely defined energy and a high quality analyzer. Further high resolution is only possible when the energies of the incident electrons are not far bigger than the energy losses. For HREELS the energy of the incident electrons is therefore mostly significantly smaller than 10^{2} eV.

Considering that 10^{2} eV electrons have a mean free path of around 1 nm (corresponds to a few monolayers), which decreases with lower energies, this automatically implies that HREELS is a surface sensitive technique. This is the reason why HREELS must be measured in reflection mode and must be implemented in ultra high vacuum (UHV). This is in contrast to Core Level EELS which operates at very high energies and can therefore also be found in transmission electron microscopes (TEM). Instrumental developments have also enabled vibrational spectroscopy to be performed in TEM.

In HREELS not only the electron energy loss can be measured, often the angular distribution of electrons of a certain energy loss in reference to the specular direction gives interesting insight to the structures on a surface.

== Physics of HREELS ==
As mentioned above HREELS involves an inelastic scattering process on a surface. For those processes the conservation of energy as well as the conservation of momentum's projection parallel to the surface hold:

$E_{i} = E_{s} + \Delta E$

$k_{i,||} = k_{s,||} + q_{||} + G$

E are energies, k and q are wave vectors and G denotes a reciprocal lattice vector. One should mention at this point that for non perfect surfaces G is not in any case a well defined quantum number, what has to be considered when using the second relation. Variables subscripted with i denote values of incident electrons those subscripted with s values of scattered electrons. "||" denotes parallel to the surface.

For the description of the inelastic scattering processes due to the excitation of vibrational modes of adsorbates different approaches exist. The simplest approach distinguishes between regimes of small and large scattering angles:

=== Dipole scattering ===
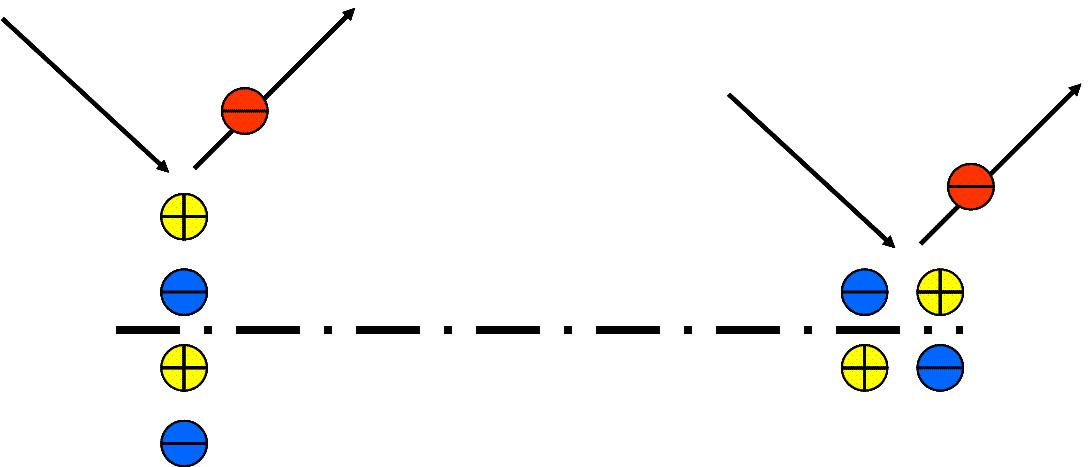
Figurative interpretation of dipole scattering

The so-called dipole scattering can be applied when the scattered beam is very near to the specular direction. In this case a macroscopic theory can be applied to explain the results. It can be approached using the so-called dielectrical theory introduced by Lucas and Šunjić of which a quantum mechanical treatment was first presented by E. Evans and D.L. Mills in the early 1970s.

Alternatively there is a more unfamiliar model which only holds exactly for perfect conductors: A unit cell at the surface does not have a homogeneous surrounding, hence it is supposed to have an electrical dipole moment. When a molecule is adsorbed to the surface there can be an additional dipole moment and the total dipole moment P is present. This dipole moment causes a long range electronic potential in the vacuum above the surface. On this potential the incident electron can scatter inelastically which means it excites vibrations in the dipole structure. The dipole moment can then be written as $P + p e^{I \omega t}$. When the adsorbate sticks to a metal surface, imaginary dipoles occur as shown in the figure on the right. Hence for an adsorbed dipole normal to the surface the dipole moment "seen" from the vacuum doubles. Whereas the dipole moment of a parallel to the surface adsorbed dipole vanishes. Hence an incident electron can excite the adsorbed dipole only when it is adsorbed normal to the surface and the vibrational mode can be detected in the energy loss spectrum. If the dipole is adsorbed parallel then no energy losses will be detected and the vibrational modes of the dipole are missing in the energy loss spectrum. When measuring the intensity of the electron energy loss peaks and comparing to other experimental results or to theoretical models it can also be determined whether a molecule is adsorbed normal to the surface or tilted by an angle.

The dielectric model also holds when the material on which the molecule adsorbs is not a metal. The picture shown above is then the limit for $\epsilon \rightarrow \infty$ where $\epsilon$ denotes the relative dielectrical constant.

As the incident electron in this model is scattered in the region above the surface, it does not directly impact the surface and because the amount of momentum transferred is small the scattering is mostly in the specular direction.

=== Impact scattering ===
Impact scattering is the regime which deals with electrons that are scattered further away from the specular direction. In those cases no macroscopic theory exists and a microscopic theory like, quantum mechanical dispersion theory, has to be applied. Symmetry considerations then also result in certain selection rules (it is also assumed that the energy loss in the inelastic scattering process is negligible):

- When the scattering plane is a plane of reflection symmetry then the scattering amplitude for every k_{s} in the scattering plane vanishes.
- When the plane perpendicular to the surface and the scattering plane is a plane of reflection symmetry and time reversal symmetry holds then the scattering amplitudes in the specular direction vanish for modes whose normal coordinates are odd under the reflection.
- When the axis normal to the surface is an axis of two-fold symmetry, and time reversal symmetry holds then the scattering amplitudes in the specular direction vanish for modes whose normal modes are odd under the twofold rotation.

All those selection rules make it possible to identify the normal coordinates of the adsorbed molecules.

=== Intermediate negative ion resonance ===
In intermediate negative ion resonance the electron forms a compound state with an adsorbed molecule during the scattering process. However, the lifetime of those states are so short that this type of scattering is barely observed. All of these regimes can at once be described with the help of the single microscopic theory.

=== Selection rules for dipole scattering from the perspective of vibrational eigenmodes ===
A microscopic theory makes it possible to approach the selection rule for dipole scattering in a more exact way. The scattering cross section is only non-vanishing in the case of a non-zero matrix element $\left\langle i \right| p_{z} \left| f \right\rangle$. Where i denotes the initial and f the final vibrational energy level of the adsorbed molecule and p_{z} the z component of its dipole moment.

As the dipole moment is something like charge times length, p_{z} has the same symmetry properties as z, which is totally symmetric. Hence the product of i and f must also be a totally symmetric function, otherwise the matrix element vanishes. Hence

excitations from the totally symmetrical ground state of a molecule are only possible to a totally symmetric vibrational state.

This is the surface selection rule for dipole scattering. Note that it says nothing about the intensity for scattering or the displacement of the atoms of the adsorbate, but its total dipole moment is the operator in the matrix element. This is important as a vibration of the atoms parallel to the surface can also cause a vibration of the dipole moment normal to the surface. Therefore, the result in the "dipole scattering" section above is not exactly correct.

When trying to gain information from selection rules, one must carefully consider whether a pure dipole or impact scattering region is investigated. Further symmetry-breaking due to strong bindings to the surface must be considered. Another problem is that in cases of larger molecules often many vibrational modes are degenerate, which could again be resolved due to strong molecule-surface interactions. Those interactions can also generate completely new dipole moments which the molecule does not have on its own. But when carefully investigating it is mostly possible to get a very good picture of how the molecule adheres to the surface by analysis of normal dipole modes.

== High resolution electron energy loss spectrometer ==
Principle of a HREELS setup

As the electrons used for HREELS are of low energy they do not only have a very short mean free path length in the sample materials but also under normal atmospheric conditions. Therefore, one has to set up the spectrometer in UHV. The spectrometer is in general a computer simulated design that optimizes the resolution while keeping an acceptable electron flux.

The electrons are generated in an electron source, by heating a tungsten cathode, which is encapsulated by a negatively charged so called repeller that prevents stray electrons from coming into the detector unit. The electrons can leave the source only through a lens system, like e.g. a slot lens system consisting of several slits all on different potential. The purpose of this system is to focus the electrons on the entrance of the monochromator unit, to get a high initial electron flux.

The monochromator is usually a concentric hemispherical analyser (CHA). In more sensitive setups an additional pre-monochromator is used. The task of the monochromator is to reduce the energy of the passing electrons to some eV due to the help of electron lenses. It further lets only those electrons pass which have the chosen initial energy. To achieve a good resolution it is already important to have incident electrons of a well defined energy one normally chooses a resolution of $\frac{\Delta E_M}{E_i}$ for the monochromator. This means, the electrons leaving the monochromator with e.g. 10 eV have an energy accurate to 10^{−1} eV. The beam's flux is then in the orders of 10^{−8} A to 10^{−10} A. The radii of the CHA are in the order of several 10 mm. And the deflector electrodes have a saw tooth profile to backscatter electrons which are reflected from the walls in order to reduce the background of electrons with the wrong E_{i}. The electrons are then focused by a lens system onto the sample. These lenses are, in contrary to those of the emitter system very flexible, as it is important is to get a good focus on the sample. To enable measurements of angular distributions all those elements are mounted on a rotate able table with the axis cantered at the sample.Its negative charge causes the electron beam to broaden. What can be prevented by charging the top and bottom plates of the CHA deflectors negative. What again causes a change in the deflection angle and has to be considered when designing the experiment.

In the scattering process at the sample the electrons can lose energies from several 10^{−2} eV up to a few electron volt. The scattered electron beam which is of around 10^{−3} lower flux than the incident beam then enters, the analyzer, another CHA.

The analyzer CHA again allows only electrons of certain energies to pass to the analyzing unit, a channel electron multiplier (CEM). For this analyzing CHA the same facts are valid as for the monochromator. Except that a $\sqrt{2/5}$ higher resolution as in the monochromator is wanted. Hence the radial dimensions of this CHA are mostly bigger by like a factor 2. Due to aberrations of the lens systems the beam has also broadened. To sustain a high enough electron flux to the analyzer the apertures are also about a factor 2 bigger. To make the analysis more accurate, especially to reduce the background of in the deflector scattered electrons often two analyzers are used, or additional apertures are added behind the analyzers as scattered electrons of the wrong energy normally leave the CHAs under large angles. In this way energy losses of 10^{−2} eV to 10 eV can be detected with accuracies of about 10^{−2} eV.

=== General problems of HREEL spectrometers ===
Due to the electron flux the apertures can become negatively charged, which makes them effectively smaller for the passing electrons. This has to be considered when doing the design of the setup as it is anyway difficult to keep different potentials, of repeller, lenses, screening elements, and the reflector, constant. Unstable potentials on lenses or CHA deflectors would cause fluctuations in the measured signal. Similar problems are caused by external electric or magnetic fields, either they cause fluctuations in the signal, or add a constant offset. That is why the sample is normally shielded by equipotential, metal electrodes to keep the region of the sample field free so that neither the probe electrons nor the sample is affected by external electric fields. Further a cylinder of a material with a high magnetic permeability, e.g. Mu-metal, built around the whole spectrometer to keep magnetic fields or field inhomogeneities at the experiment down to 10 mG or 1mG/cm. Because of the same reason the whole experiment, except the lenses which are normally made of coated copper, is designed in stainless antimagnetic steel and insulating parts are avoided wherever possible.

== See also ==
- Electron energy loss spectroscopy

== Bibliography ==
- Brydson, R. (2001). Electron Energy Loss Spectroscopy. Electron Energy Loss Spectroscopy.
- Ertl, G; J. Küppers (1985). Low Energy Electrons and Surface Chemistry. VCH, Weinheim.
- Ibach, H. (1977). Electron Spectroscopy for Surface Analysis. Springer, Berlin, Heidelberg.
- Ibach, H. (1991). Electron Energy Loss Spectrometers. Springer, Berlin, Heidelberg.
- Ibach, H.; D.L. Mills (1982). Electron Energy Loss Spectroscopy and Surface Vibrations. Academic Press, New York.
- A.A. Lucas; M. Sunjic (1971). "Fast-Electron Spectroscopy of Surface Excitations". Phys. Rev. Lett. 26 (5): 229–232. doi:10.1103/PhysRevLett.26.229.
