= Škrabalo =

Škrabalo is a surname. Notable people with the surname include:

- Ivo Škrabalo (1934–2011), Croatian film critic, screenwriter, and member of parliament
- Zdenko Škrabalo (1929–2014), Croatian physician, academician and diplomat
