= Ivan Malenica (politician) =

Croatian lawyer & politician (born 1985)

Minister of Justice and Public Administration
- In office 24 July 2020 – 17 May 2024
- Prime Minister: Andrej Plenković
- Preceded by: Dražen Bošnjaković (Minister of Justice); Himself (Minister of Public Administration)
- Succeeded by: Damir Habijan

Minister of Public Administration
- In office 22 July 2019 – 24 July 2020
- Prime Minister: Andrej Plenković
- Preceded by: Lovro Kuščević
- Succeeded by: Himself (Minister of Justice and Public Administration)

Personal details
- Born: 21 July 1985 (age 41) Šibenik, SR Croatia, SFR Yugoslavia
- Party: Croatian Democratic Union
- Education: University of Split; University of Zagreb

Ivan Malenica (born 21 July 1985) is a Croatian lawyer and politician serving as Minister of Justice and Public Administration since 2020.

== Early life and education ==
Malenica was born in Šibenik on 21 July 1985, where he attended elementary and high school. He graduated from the Split Faculty of Law in 2008. In 2013 Malenica was a student at the postgraduate doctoral study of the Zagreb Faculty of Law in the direction of Public law and administration.

His family is originally from Brištani, one of the seven villages in the Miljevci area near the town of Drniš, in Šibenik-Knin County. His father Ante was a long-time director of Ceste Šibenik, and his uncle Frane is one of the founders of the Croatian People's Party's branch in Šibenik, and current director of the Vodovod i odvodnja, a water supply company and drainage in Šibenik.

== Political career ==
In 2016 Malenica was named a candidate of the Croatian Democratic Union for the State Secretary in the Ministry of Public Administration in the period when Andrej Plenković came to power, but Josipa Rimac took over the role. In 2018 after the elections in the HDZ's Šibenik-Knin County branch, he became the president of the HDZ board of governors. He was also in charge of advising Prime Minister Plenković on issues related to the public administration, then received the unanimous support of the party president and the party's national council.

After a series of real estate affairs Lovro Kuščević resigned as minister of public administration, whereupon on 17 July 2019 Plenković appointed Malenica for Kuščević's successor. He stressed on that occasion that he will do everything to make the public administration serve the citizens and that they will realize their rights and particular interests as soon as possible and with as little financial resources as possible. A very important project and means that will enable all this to be considered digitalization of public administration.

On 21 July 2020, on his 35th birthday, Malenica tested positive for the COVID-19 amid its pandemic in Croatia, while three days later he sworn in as Minister of Justice and Public Administration in the second Plenković cabinet.

== See also ==
- Cabinet of Andrej Plenković I
- Cabinet of Andrej Plenković II

Political offices
Preceded by Lovro Kuščević	Minister of Public Administration; 2019–2020	Succeeded by Position abolished
Political offices
Preceded by Dražen Bošnjaković (Minister of Justice); Himself (Minister of Public Administration)	Minister of Justice and Public Administration; 2020–present	Incumbent
