= Lumbarda Psephisma =

Stone inscription in ancient Greek language

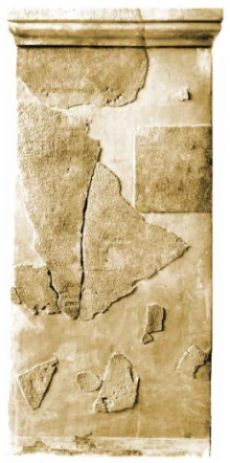
- Material: Stone
- Created: 300–250 BC
- Discovered: 1877; Lumbarda, Croatia
- Present location: Zagreb, Croatia
- Language: Ancient Greek

The Lumbarda Psephisma (Croatian: Lumbardska psefizma), also known as Lumbardian Decree, is an ancient Greek stone inscription dating from the 3rd or 4th century BC. The artifact was discovered in 1877 in Lumbarda, a small village on the eastern tip of the island of Korčula in modern-day Croatia, and talks about the founding of a Greek settlement on that location by colonists from Issa (today's island of Vis).

"Psephisma" (Ancient Greek: ψήφισμα, romanized: psḗphisma) is a term used in ancient Greece for a resolution arrived at by voting. The artifact is considered the oldest written document ever found in Croatia, and is today kept at the Archaeological Museum in Zagreb.

== The inscription ==
The island of Korčula (Ancient Greek: Μέλαινα Κόρκυρα, lit. 'Black Korkyra'), already had a Greek settlement on its western side, founded by settlers from Knidos, at the time the inscription was made.

The document, titled descriptively by scholars as "Decree of Issa concerning a colony on Korkyra Melaina" details the agreement reached by an assembly to establish and distribute land parcels to Greek colonists who arrived from the island of Issa (today known as Vis). It is thought to date from 300–250 BC.

The settlement is believed to have been located close to present-day Lumbarda, on a strategically important location overlooking the narrow strait separating Korčula and the Pelješac peninsula, in an area populated by native Illyrian tribes. According to the document, the Issans established their settlement based on a prior agreement with two representatives of local Illyrians named Pyllos and his son Dazos:

"During the time of the Hieromnemon Praxidamos, in the Machanemus month, the contract about the founding of the settlement was drawn up between the people from Issa and Pyllos and his son Dazos. The founders agreed and the people decided: that those who first took the land and walled the town would get special sites for building inside the fortified town ...and that the authorities swear that the town and the land will never again be divided .. ."

The stone inscription was discovered on top of a hill called Koludrt, and it is believed that this is where the Issan town most likely once stood. The document ends with a list of 200 names of Greek families who settled the area.

This valuable document is the oldest piece of writing found on the territory of Croatia. Its significance is in that it confirms that ancient Illyrians lived on the island of Korčula, and also offers insight into the way Greeks set up colonies and trading outposts throughout Dalmatia. The colonies were set up so the Greeks could trade with the Illyrians.

There is no evidence to suggest that the two communities interacted on a larger scale, and it is likely that they kept to themselves. The Illyrians who had lived according to their ancient ways in the region for centuries as tribal farmers and livestock herders, and they would have been a sharp contrast to the Greek Hellenic way of doing things, with their urban culture and social organization. Nevertheless, the two communities coexisted peacefully until the Illyro-Roman Wars in the latter part of 3rd century BC.

== Greek colonies ==
Based on historical facts there were two Greek Colonies on Korčula. Periegesis in the 1st century mentions a Greek Cnidian colony on island Black Kerkyra (Korčula) Greek colonists from Corcyra (Corfu) formed a small colony on the island in the 6th century BC. Black Corfu (Korčula) was named after their homeland and, the black was added to reflect the dense cypress and pine-woods on Korčula itself. Archeological finds are numerous, including carved marble tombstones, ceramics and foundations of Greek villas. These artifacts can be found in the town of Korčula's island museum.

== See also ==
- Croatia
- Lumbarda
- Korčula
