= Zvonimir Šeparović =

Croatian jurist and politician (1928–2022)

Minister of Justice
- In office 15 April 1999 – 27 January 2000
- Prime Minister: Zlatko Mateša
- Preceded by: Milan Ramljak
- Succeeded by: Stjepan Ivanišević

Minister of Foreign Affairs
- In office 31 July 1991 – 27 May 1992
- Prime Minister: Franjo Gregurić
- Preceded by: Davorin Rudolf
- Succeeded by: Zdenko Škrabalo

Personal details
- Born: 14 September 1928 Blato, Kingdom of Serbs, Croats and Slovenes (modern Croatia)
- Died: 30 January 2022 (aged 93) Zagreb, Croatia
- Party: Croatian Democratic Union
- Spouse: Branka Šeparović
- Education: University of Zagreb; University of Ljubljana

Zvonimir Šeparović (14 September 1928 – 30 January 2022) was a Croatian jurist and politician.

== Biography ==
Šeparović was a professor of Criminal Law at the University of Zagreb and rector of the university from 1989 to 1991. He was also known as the pioneer of victimology and a vocal opponent of death penalty.

Although he lacked any formal party or political affiliation, in 1991, he became foreign minister in the "National Government" of Franjo Gregurić. In 1992, he became the Permanent Representative of Croatia to the United Nations. He remained active in public life and did at one point become both a member of the Croatian Democratic Union (HDZ) as well as a member of the party's Central Committee.

In 2000, he entered the presidential race as an independent candidate, opposed to the official HDZ candidate Mate Granić. He finished last and, immediately after being informed about projected results, urged his supporters to vote for Dražen Budiša in the second round.

== Personal life and death ==
Šeparović was married to Branka, a Croatian Radiotelevision reporter. He died on 30 January 2022, at the age of 93.

Government offices
Preceded by Davorin Rudolf	Minister of Foreign Affairs; 1991–1992	Succeeded by Zdenko Škrabalo
Preceded by Milan Ramljak	Minister of Justice; 1999–2000	Succeeded by Stjepan Ivanišević
Diplomatic posts
Preceded by Office established	Permanent Representative of Croatia to the United Nations; 1992	Succeeded by Mario Nobilo
Academic offices
Preceded by Vladimir Stipetić	Rector of the University of Zagreb; 1989–1991	Succeeded by Marijan Šunjić
