= Archaeological Museum in Zagreb =

- Arheološki muzej u Zagrebu
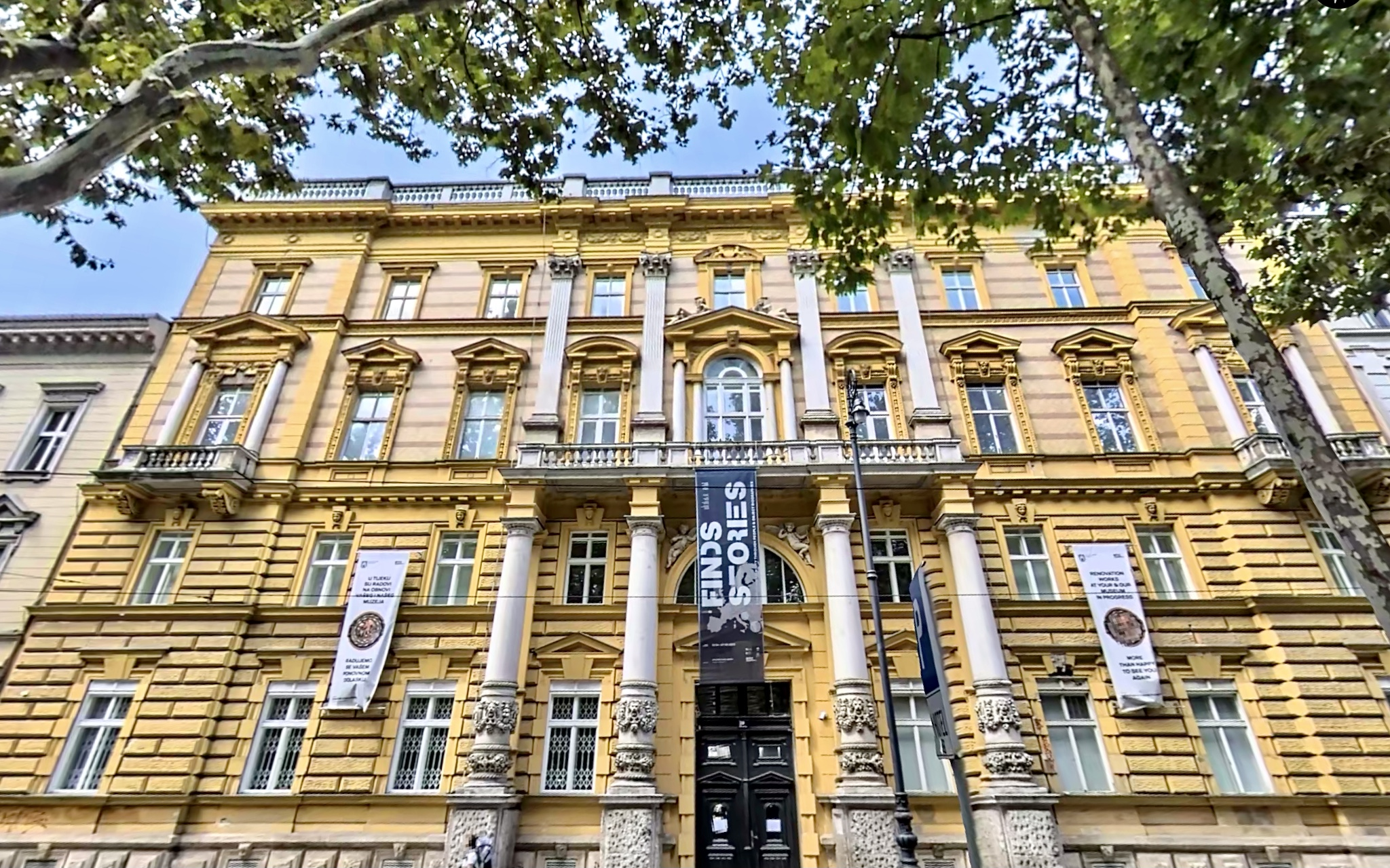
- Museum building, located in Zagreb city centre
- Established: 1836; 190 years ago
- Location: 19 Nikola Šubić Zrinski Square, Zagreb, Croatia
- Coordinates: 45°48′40″N 15°58′38″E
- Type: Archaeology museum
- Key holdings: Liber Linteus Zagrabiensis; Lumbarda Psephisma
- Visitors: 78,739 (2017)
- Website: amz.hr

The Archaeological Museum (Croatian: Arheološki muzej u Zagrebu) in Zagreb, Croatia is an archaeological museum with over 450,000 varied artifacts and monuments, gathered from various sources but mostly from Croatia and in particular from the surroundings of Zagreb.

Its predecessor institution was the "National Museum" (German: Kroatisches Nationalmuseum Agram) in the Austrian Empire, open to the public since 1846. It was renamed to "State Institute of Croatia, Slavonia, and Dalmatia" in 1866. In 1878, the Archaeological Department became an independent institution within the State Institute, and the umbrella institute was dissolved in 1939, leaving the Archaeological Museum as a standalone institution. The archaeological collection of the State Institute had been kept in the Academy mansion at Zrinski Square from the 1880s and remained there until 1945, when the museum moved to its current location at the 19th-century Vranyczany-Hafner mansion, 19 Zrinski Square.

The museum consists of five main sections: Prehistory, Egypt, Antiquity, Middle Ages, Coins and Medals.

The section "Prehistory" contains 78,000 objects, ranging from the Paleolithic to the Late Iron Age. The section "Egypt" displays about 600 objects in the permanent exhibition. The section "Antiquity" contains an important collection of Greek vases (about 1,500 vessels) and stones with inscriptions. The Roman Antiquity is represented by many statues, military equipment, metal objects, Roman religion and art and objects from everyday life, acquired through systematic archaeological excavations in various Croatian regions in many Croatian cities founded during the Roman Empire. The numismatic section is among the largest collections of this type in Europe.

Some of the famous artifacts include:

- Vučedol dove, a flagon shaped as a bird
- Liber Linteus, 3rd century BCE mummy and bandages with the longest Etruscan inscription in existence
- Lumbarda Psephisma, 4th century BCE stone inscription detailing the founding of an ancient Greek colony on the island of Korčula

The museum is home to the mummified remains of a young Egyptian man who according to carbon dating died at some time between 900BC and 790BC.

As of April 2024, the museum's permanent exhibition is closed to the public because of building repairs due to the damage from the 2020 Zagreb earthquake. Temporary exhibitions are accessible, though, on the 1st floor of the museum.

== Gallery ==
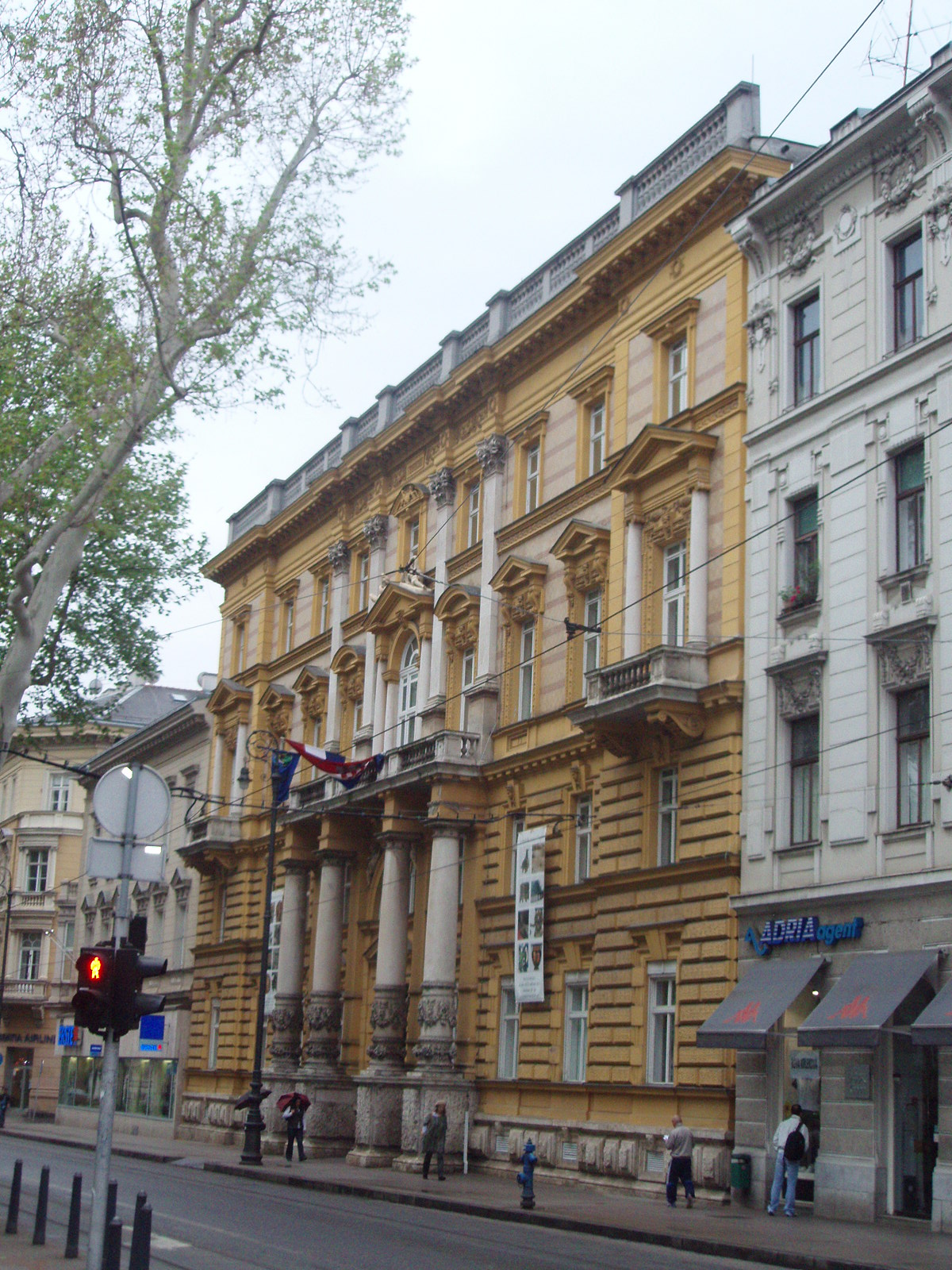
Facade of the Museum during the day

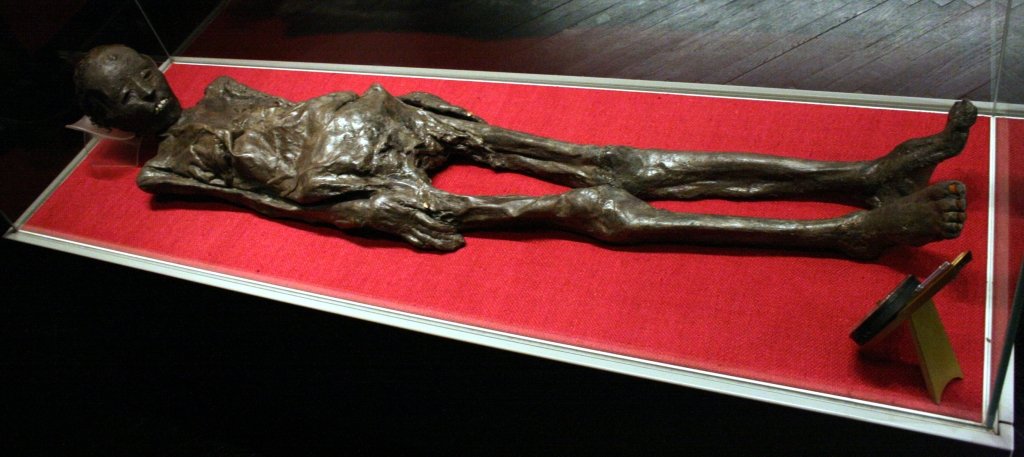
Zagreb Mummy

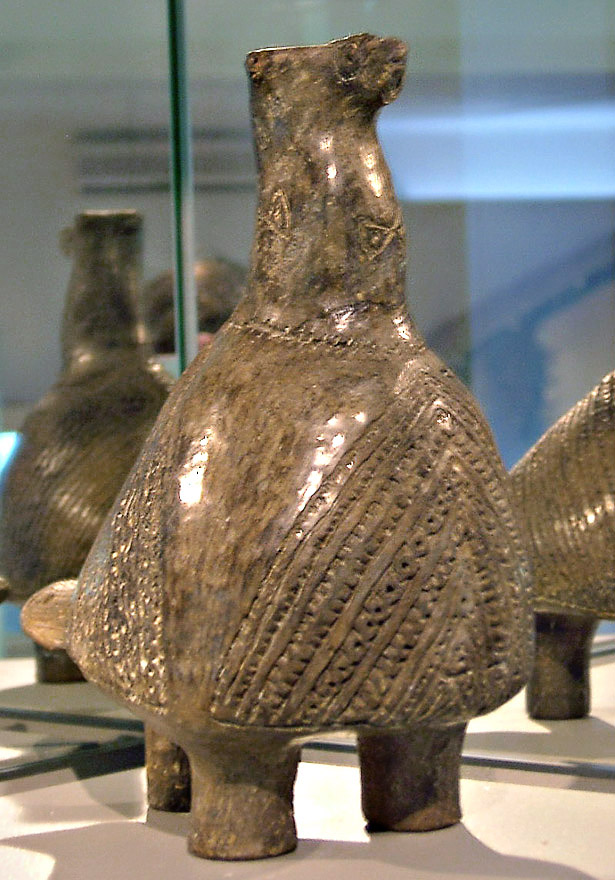
The Vučedol dove, emblem of Vučedol culture

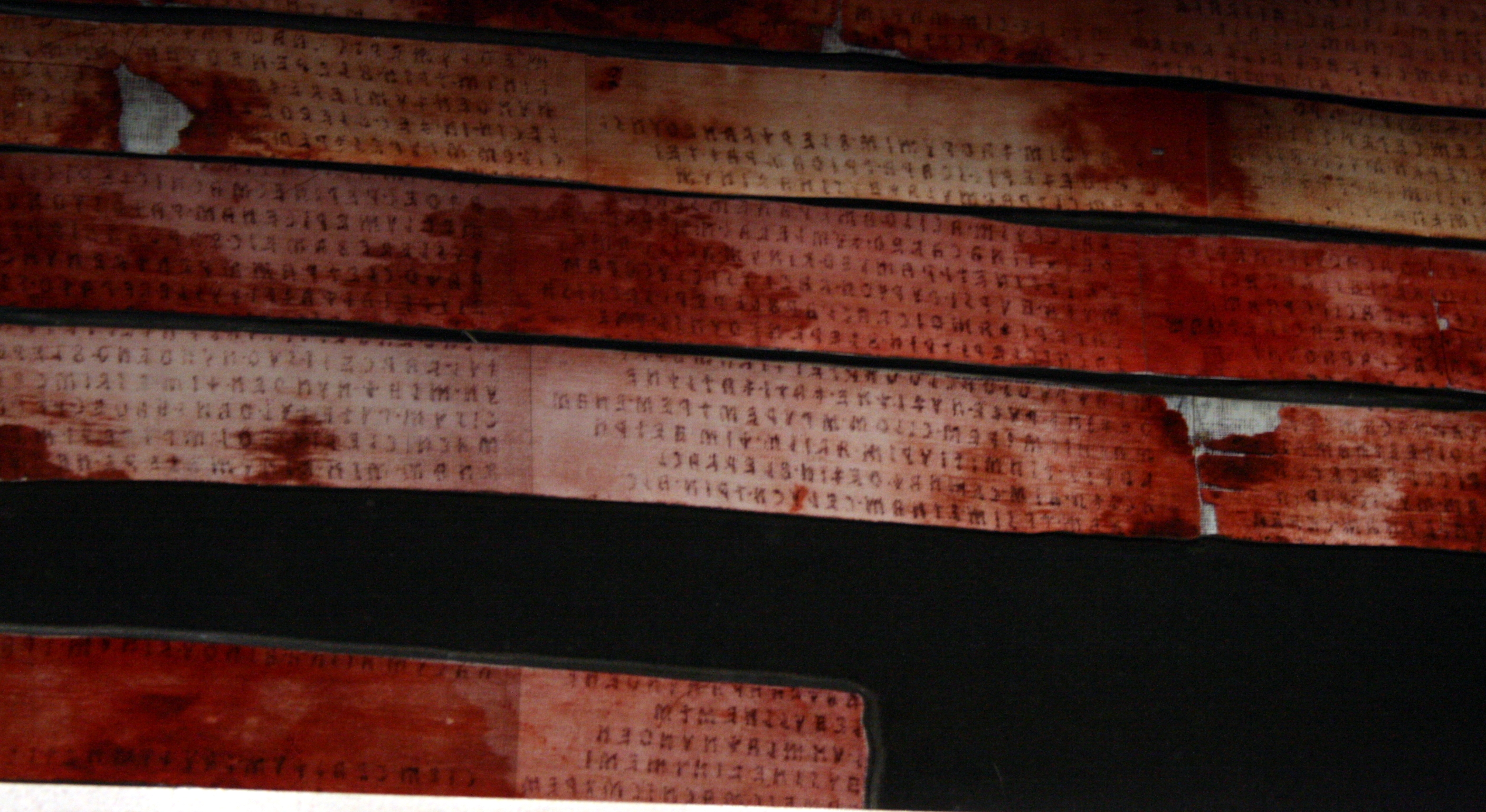
Liber Linteus Zagrabiensis ("Linen Book of Zagreb »)

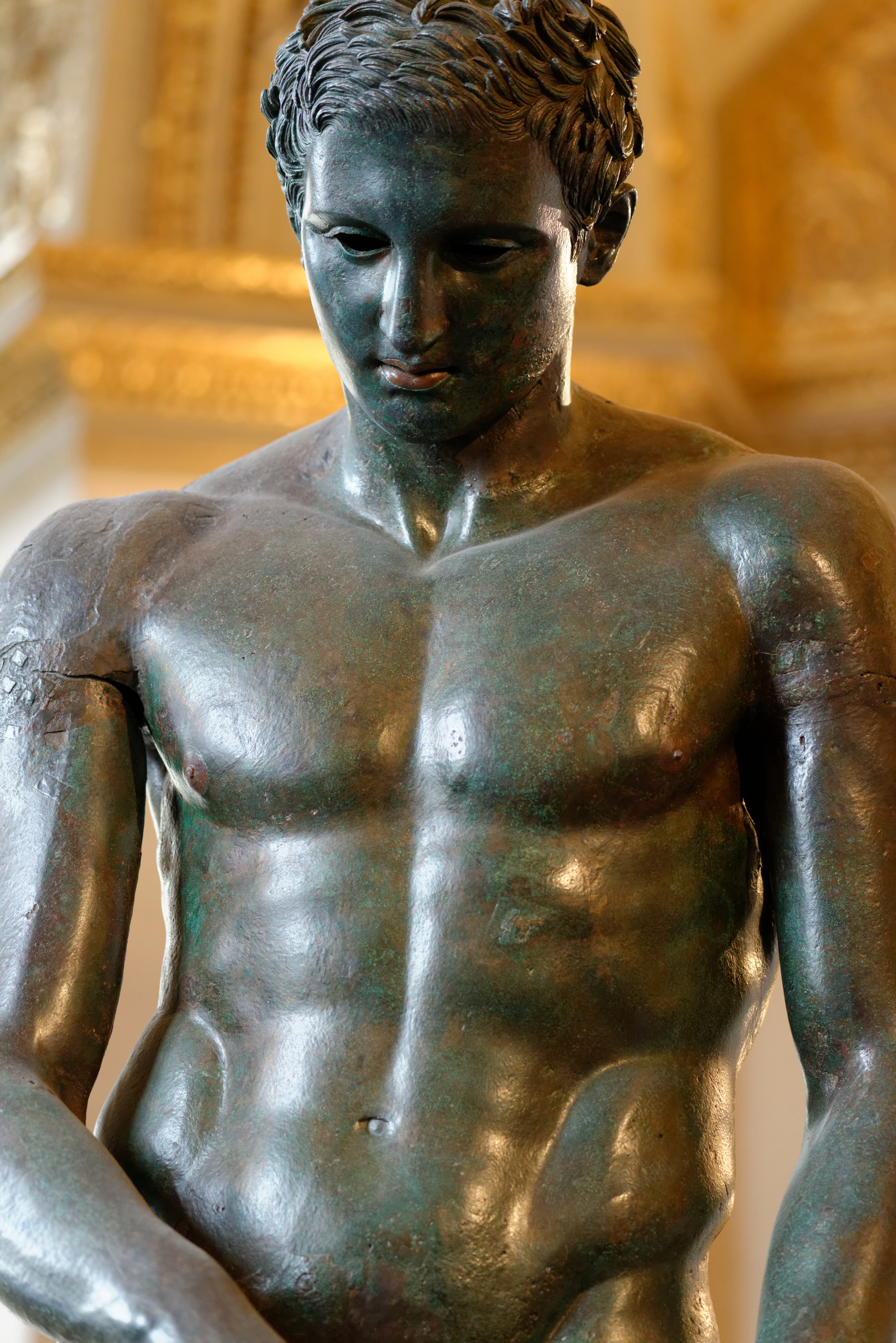
Croatian Apoxyomenos, statue of an athlete scraping himself

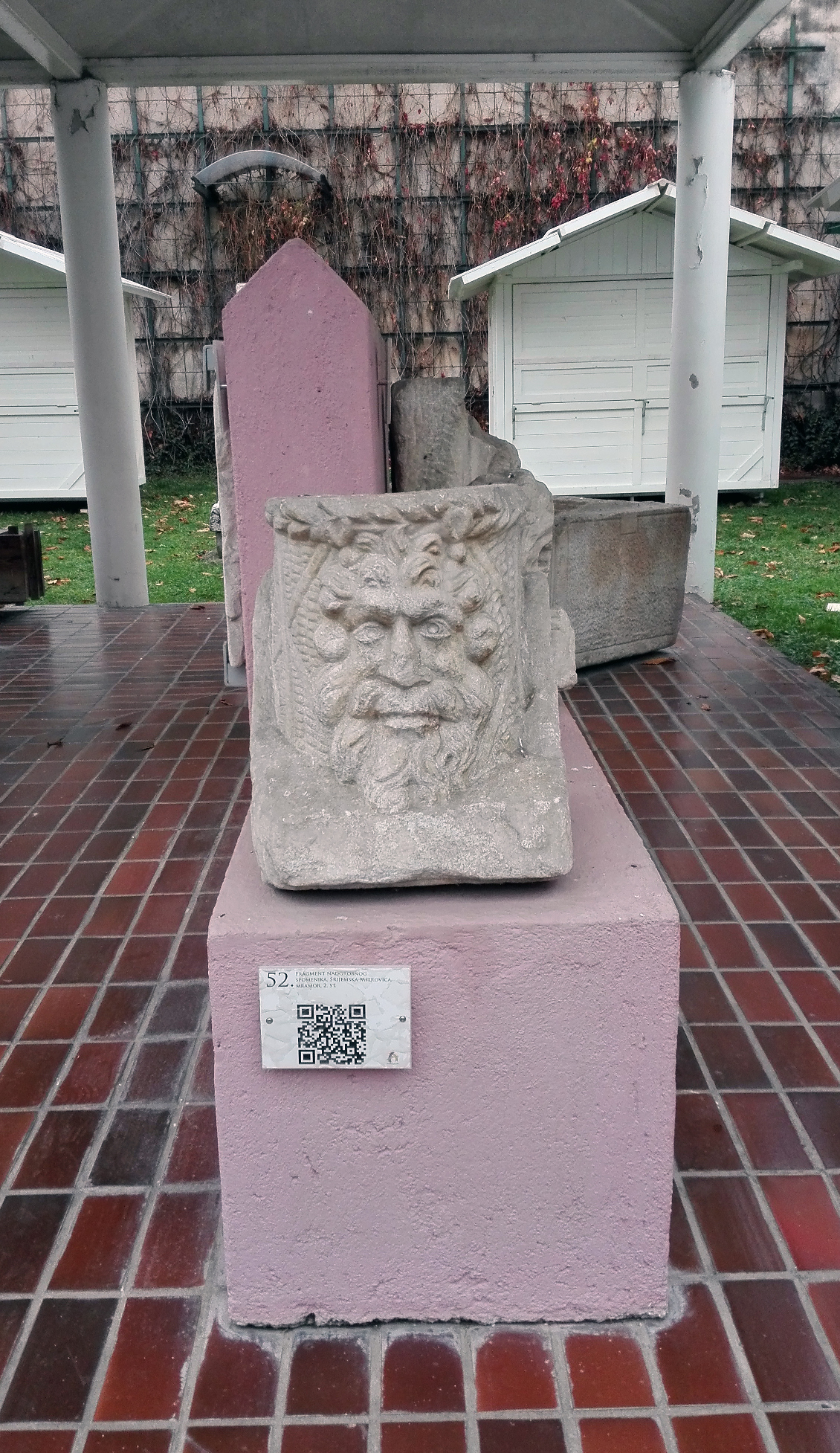
Fragment of gravestone from Sirmium, II century

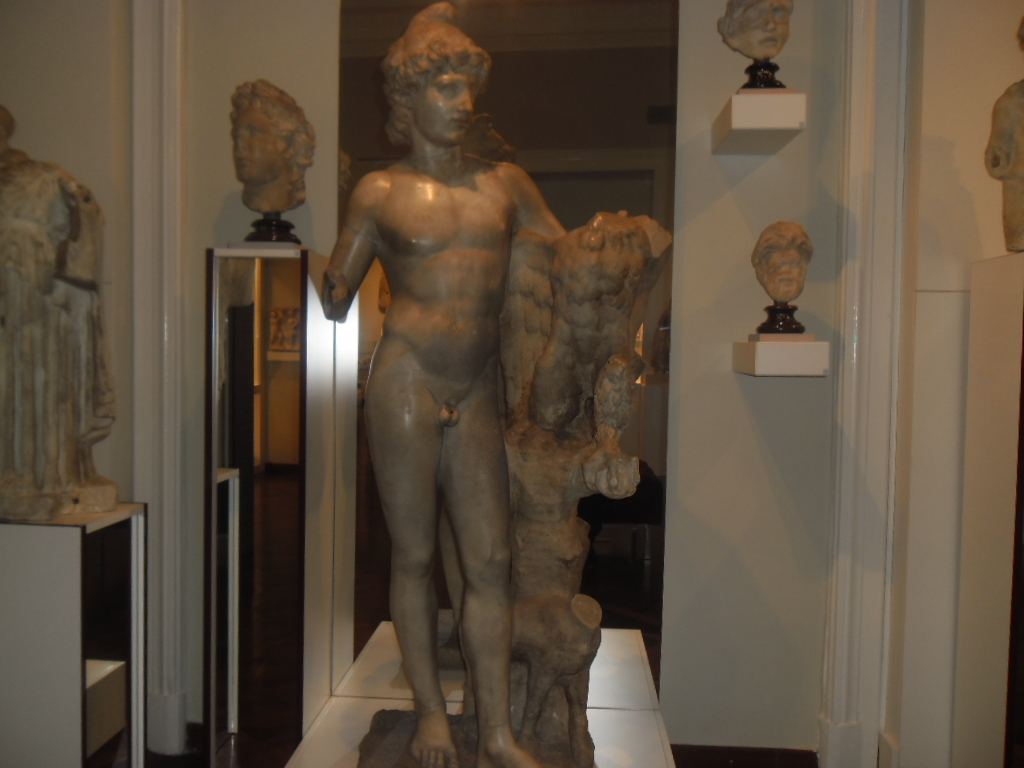
Antiques

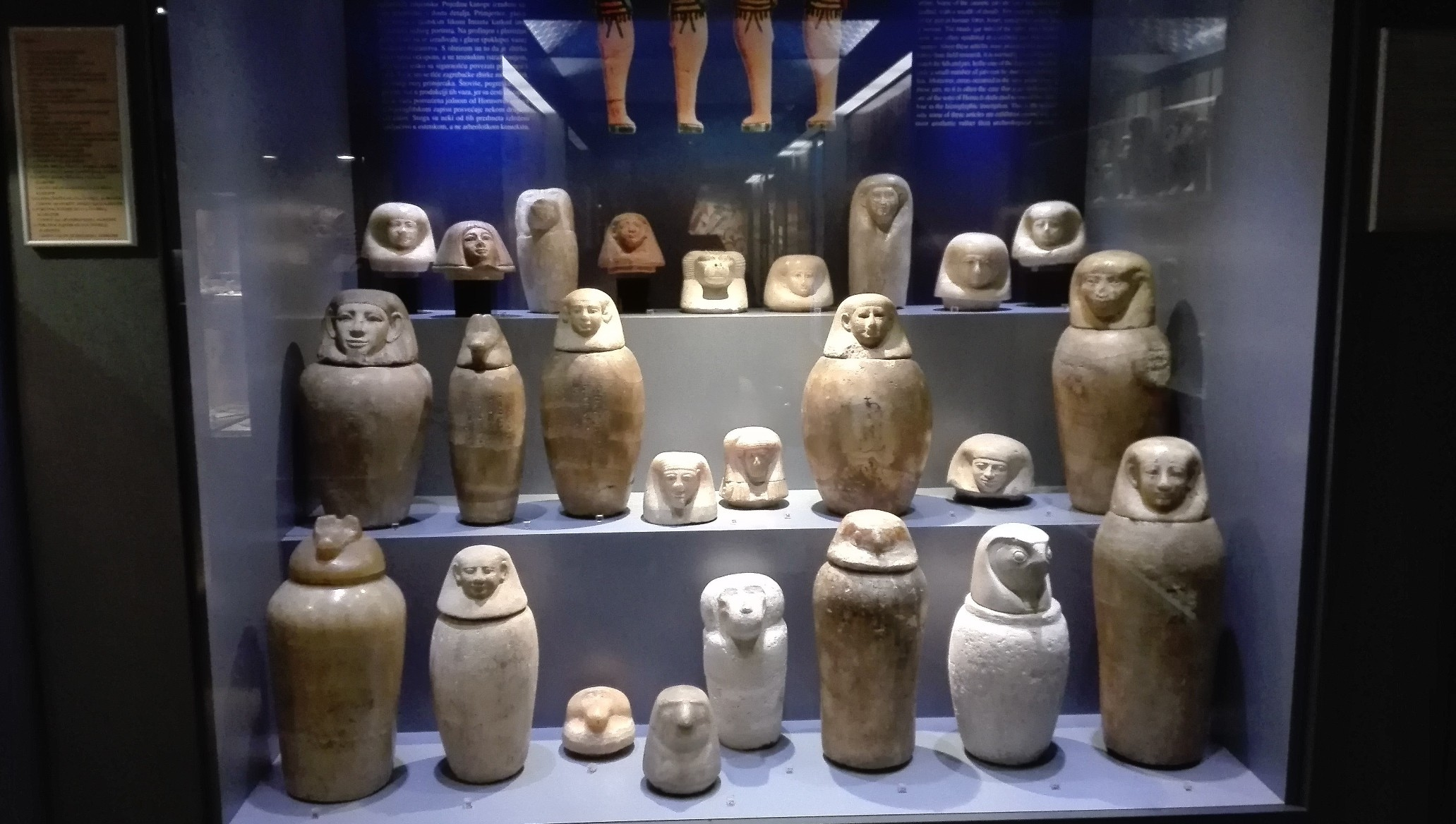
Egyptian antiques

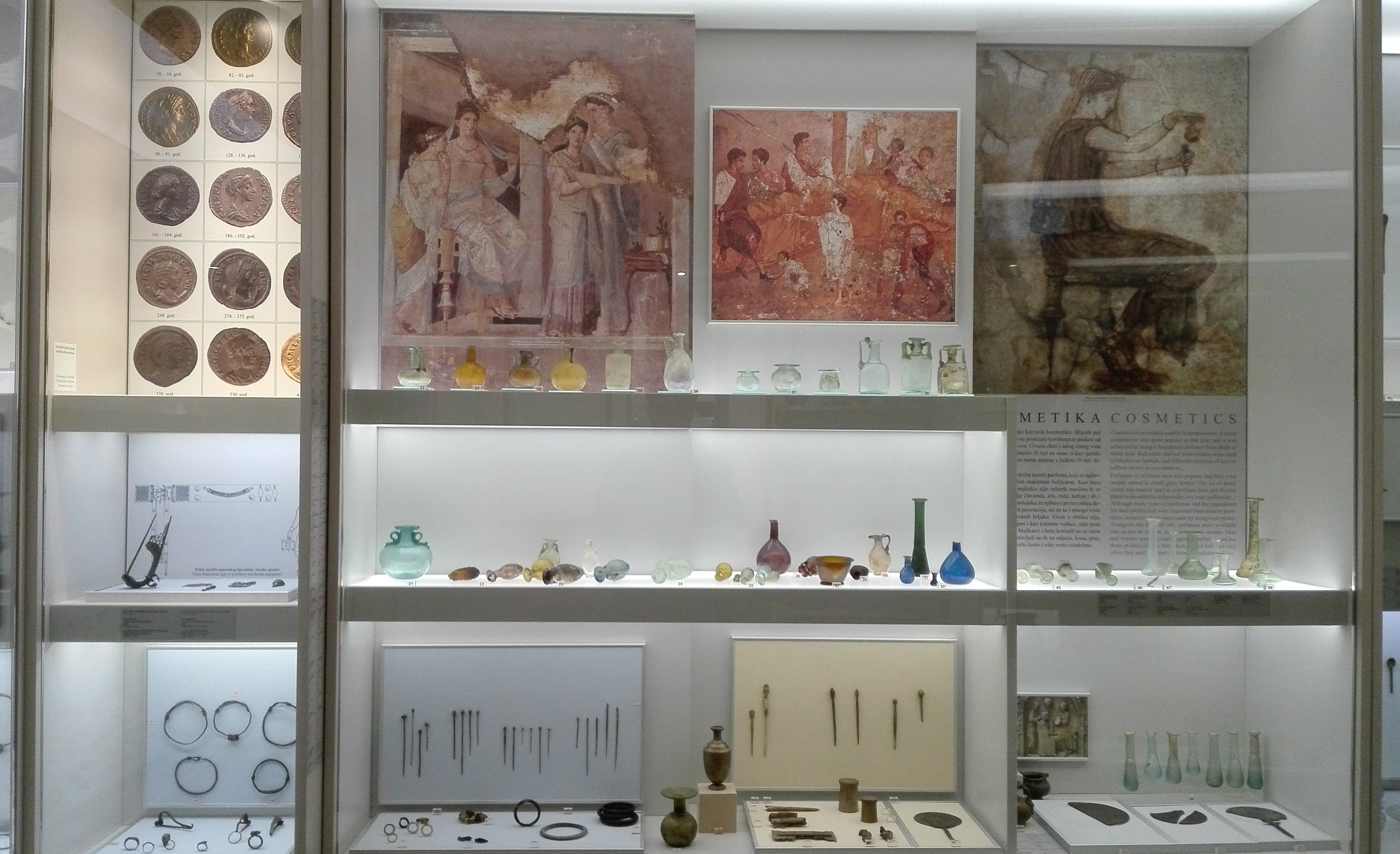
Cosmetics from Roman period

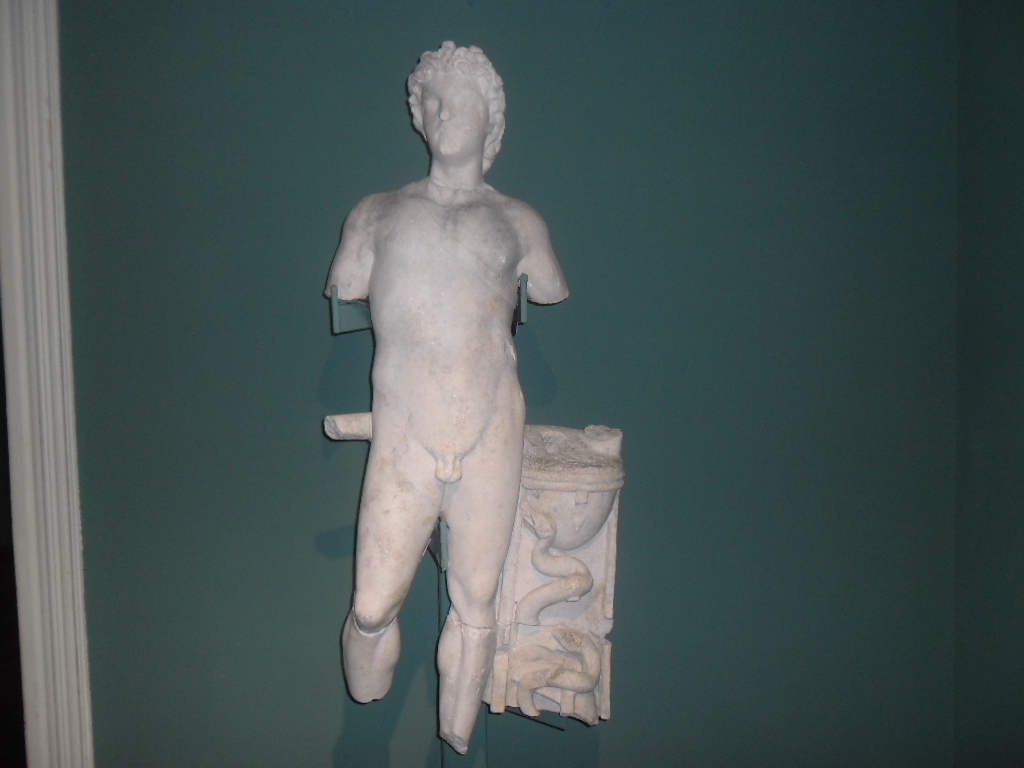
Statue of Apolon

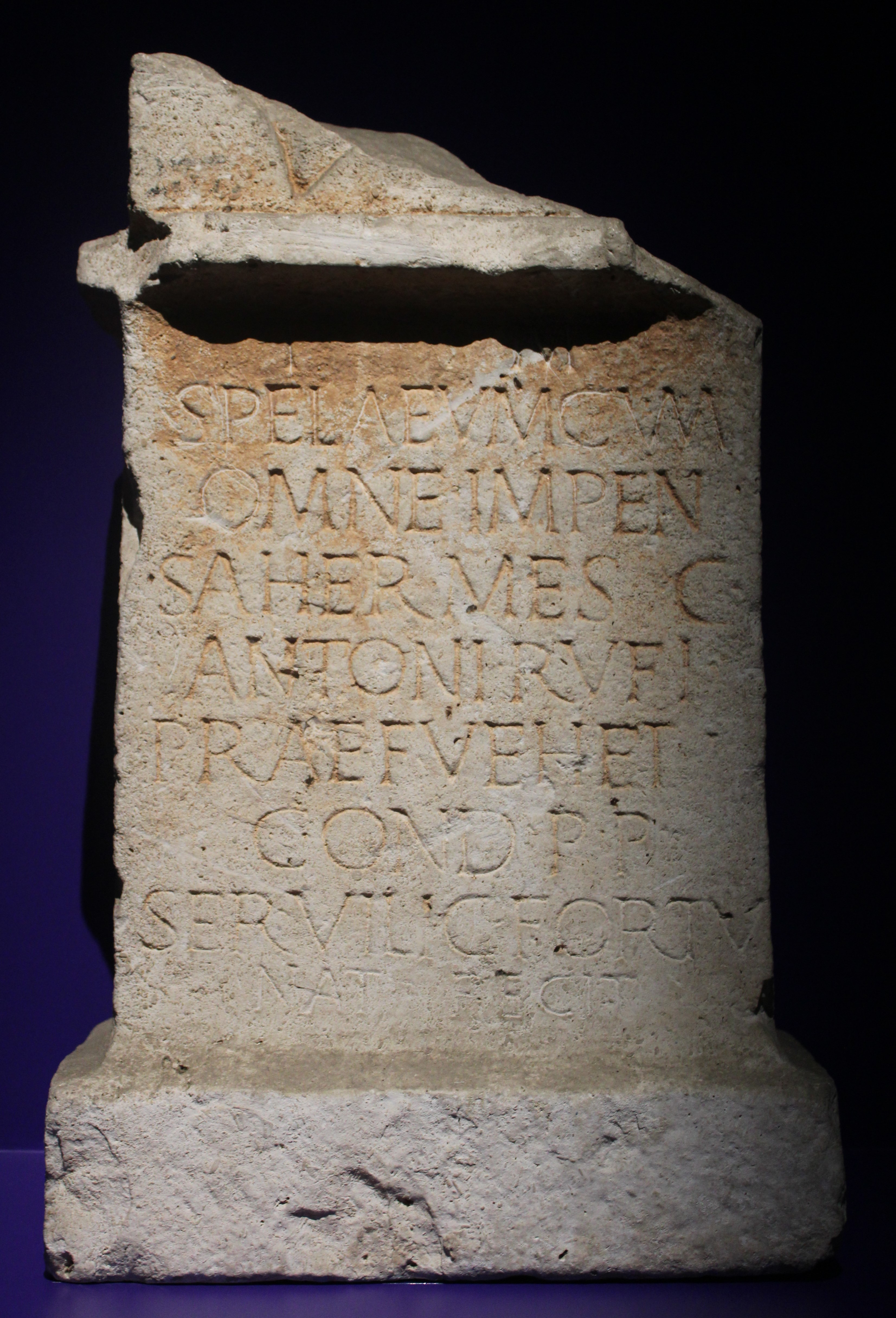
votive altar from Senj

== See also ==
- List of museums in Croatia
