= Marijan Šunjić (physicist) =

Croatian physicist

Marijan Šunjić (Croatian pronunciation: [mârijaːn ʃǔːɲitɕ]) (born 5 April 1940 in Zagreb) is a Croatian physicist, university professor, former rector of the University of Zagreb and a diplomat.

Šunjić went to the Classical Gymnasium in Zagreb and later enrolled at the Faculty of Science, University of Zagreb (Croatian Prirodoslovno-matematički fakultet or PMF) where he graduated from the Physics department in 1963. In 1966 he earned his Master of Science degree at the Faculty of Science with a thesis in theoretical solid-state physics and 1970 he earned a doctorate at the Imperial College London. Between 1963 and 1970 he worked at the Ruđer Bošković Institute and in 1981 he became a professor at the Zagreb Faculty of Science. Between 1983 and 1989 he was the head of the department for postgraduate studies in physics at the Faculty of Science.

Šunjić held many posts in Croatian and international university associations and between 1990 and 1991 he held the post of assistant to the Croatian Science Minister Osman Muftić. Šunjić then served as the Rector of the University of Zagreb for almost seven years between 25 April 1991 and 8 February 1998, and between 1998 and 2000 he was Croatia's ambassador to the Holy See.

His main scientific interests are in the area of theoretical condensed matter physics, especially surface physics, electron spectroscopy (HREELS), and photoemission. He has published over 100 scientific papers. He is a member of the Institute of Physics in London and the American Institute of Physics. Šunjić was also made honorary senator of the University of Maribor and he received an honorary doctorate from the University of Mostar.

== See also ==
- Doniach-Sunjic lineshape

== Selected publications ==
- S. Doniach; M. Sunjic (1970). "Many-electron singularity in X-ray photoemission and X-ray line spectra from metals". J. Phys. C: Solid State Phys. Vol. 3, no. 2. pp. 285–291.
- A.A. Lucas; M. Sunjic (1971). "Fast-Electron Spectroscopy of Surface Excitations". Phys. Rev. Lett. 26 (5): 229–232. Bibcode:1971PhRvL..26..229L. doi:10.1103/PhysRevLett.26.229.
- A.A. Lucas; M. Sunjic (1971). "Multiple Plasmon Effects in the Energy-Loss Spectra of Electrons in Thin Films". Phys. Rev. B. 3 (3): 719. Bibcode:1971PhRvB...3..719S. doi:10.1103/PhysRevB.3.719.
- A.A. Lucas; M. Sunjic (1972). "Fast-electron spectroscopy of collective excitations in solids". Progress in Surface Science. 2: 75–137. Bibcode:1972PrSS....2...75L. doi:10.1016/0079-6816(72)90002-0.
- J.W. Gadzuk; M. Sunjic (1975). "Excitation energy dependence of core-level x-ray-photoemission-spectra line shapes in metals". Phys. Rev. B. 12 (2): 524. Bibcode:1975PhRvB..12..524G. doi:10.1103/PhysRevB.12.524.

Preceded by Zvonimir Šeparović	Rector of the University of Zagreb; 25 April 1991 – 8 February 1998	Succeeded by Branko Jeren
