= Marijan Šunjić =

Marijan Šunjić may refer to:

- Marijan Šunjić (bishop) (1798–1860), Bosnian Franciscan, bishop, writer and linguist
- Marijan Šunjić (physicist) (born 1940), Croatian physicist, professor and diplomat
