= Orsat Miljenić =

Croatian politician (born 1968)

Orsat Miljenić mr. sc.
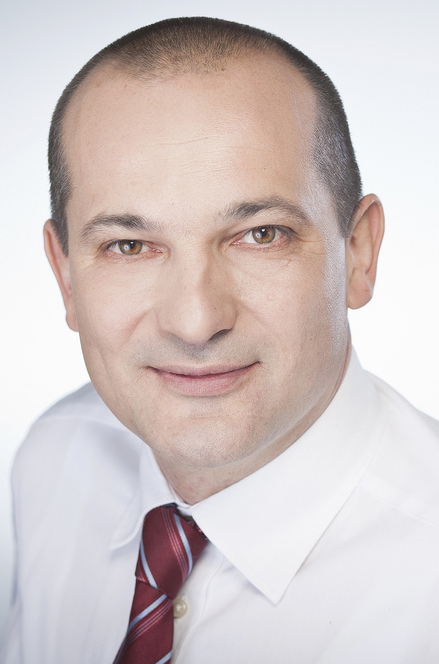

Chief of Staff of the Office of the President of Croatia
- Incumbent
- Assumed office 18 February 2020
- President: Zoran Milanović
- Preceded by: Anamarija Kirinić

Minister of Justice
- In office 23 December 2011 – 22 January 2016
- Prime Minister: Zoran Milanović
- Preceded by: Dražen Bošnjaković
- Succeeded by: Ante Šprlje

Personal details
- Born: 15 September 1968 (age 58) Dubrovnik, SR Croatia, SFR Yugoslavia (modern Croatia)
- Party: Social Democratic Party (2015–)
- Education: University of Zagreb, Central European University

Orsat Miljenić (born 15 September 1968) is a Croatian lawyer, diplomat, and politician currently serving as Chief of Staff of the Office of the President of Croatia. He served as Croatia's Minister of Justice from 2011 to 2015, in the Cabinet of Zoran Milanović.

Miljenić was born in Dubrovnik, and graduated from the law faculty of the University of Zagreb in 1993. He got his master's degree in Central European University in Budapest in 1995. He is a veteran of the Croatian War of Independence. He served from 1996 to 2000 as a diplomat in the Netherlands, and from 2000 to 2002 as president of Government Office for Cooperation with NGOs. He was a deputy minister of Foreign Affairs and European Integration from 2002 to 2004 in Cabinet of Ivica Račan II. After that, he worked as a lawyer until he was appointed the role of Minister of Justice on 23 December 2011, in the Cabinet of Zoran Milanović.

He is married with three children. He is also one of the founding members of the Transparency International Croatia. He speaks English, French and Croatian.

Political offices
Preceded by Dražen Bošnjaković	Minister of Justice; 2011–2016	Succeeded by Ante Šprlje
