= Ivan Šimonović =

Croatian diplomat, politician and law scholar

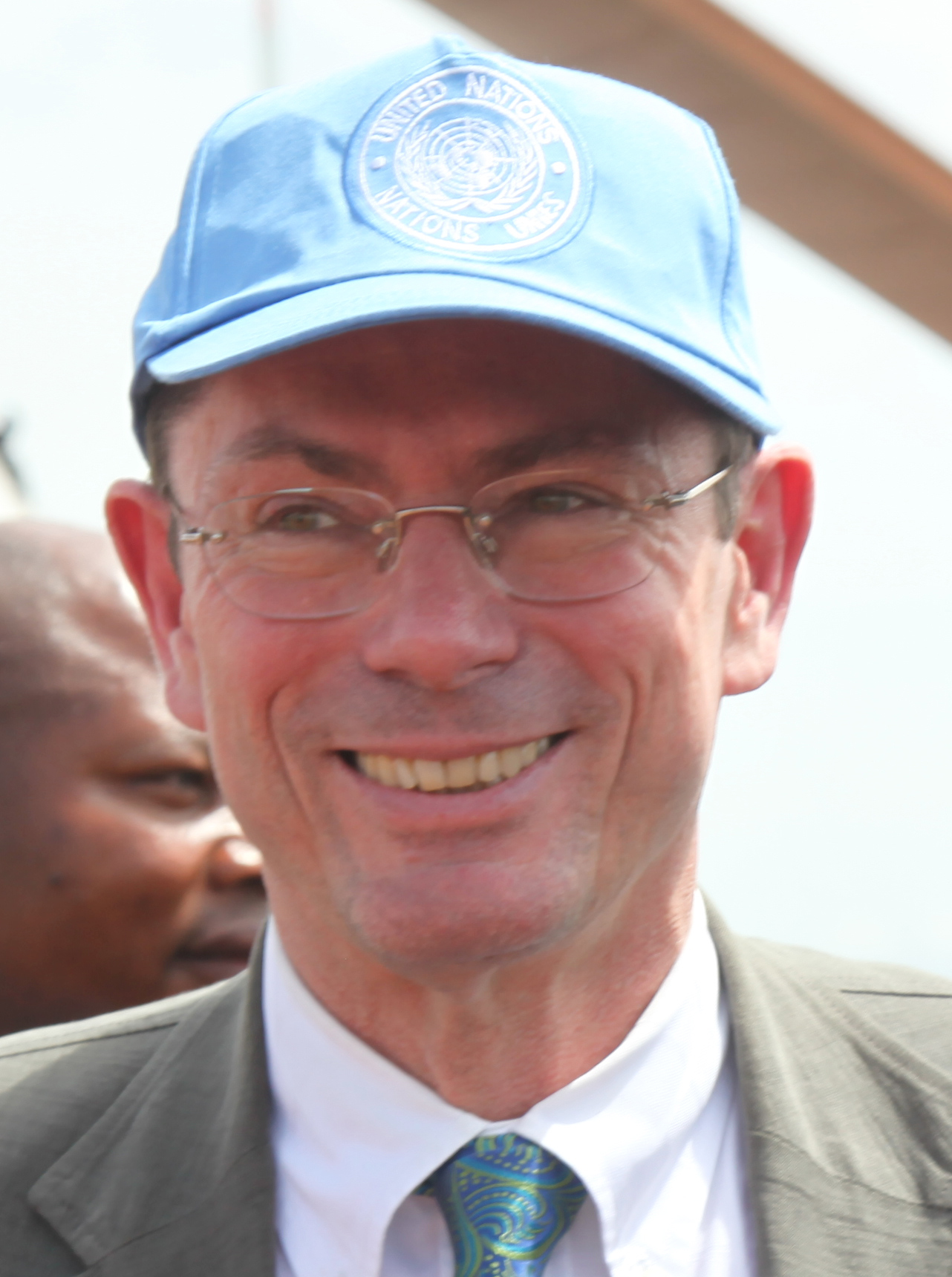

United Nations Assistant Secretary-General for Human Rights
- In office 17 July 2010 – 30 September 2016
- Preceded by: Office established
- Succeeded by: Andrew Gilmour

Minister of Justice
- In office 10 October 2008 – 7 July 2010
- Prime Minister: Ivo Sanader (2008–09); Jadranka Kosor (2009–10)
- Preceded by: Ana Lovrin
- Succeeded by: Dražen Bošnjaković

Permanent Representative to the United Nations of Croatia
- In office 7 February 1997 – 8 February 2003
- Preceded by: Mario Nobilo
- Succeeded by: Vladimir Drobnjak

Personal details
- Born: 2 May 1959 (age 67) Zagreb, SR Croatia, SFR Yugoslavia
- Party: Independent
- Education: University of Zagreb

Ivan Šimonović (Croatian pronunciation: [ǐʋan ʃimǒːnoʋit͡ɕ]; born 2 May 1959) is a Croatian diplomat, politician and law scholar. In October 2008 he was appointed Justice Minister of Croatia. On 3 May 2010, Šimonović was appointed UN Assistant Secretary-General for Human Rights. As of 1 October 2016, Šimonović has been appointed as the Secretary-General’s Special Adviser on the Responsibility to Protect.

== Education and career ==
Šimonović graduated from the University of Zagreb Law School in 1982. He obtained a doctoral degree in 1990, at the age of 31. Šimonović joined the Croatian diplomatic corps after the break-up of Yugoslavia. He was an assistant and deputy to Foreign Minister Mate Granić during the 1990s, although he never joined the ruling party, the Croatian Democratic Union (HDZ).

In 1997, Croatian President Franjo Tuđman named him ambassador to the United Nations. Šimonović served there until 2002. While serving there, Šimonović presided over the United Nations Economic and Social Council.

In 2002, Šimonovic was named Deputy Foreign Minister in Ivica Račan's government. He remained independent and did not join the ruling SDP. When the HDZ swung back to power in 2003, Šimonović was not offered a job in the new government.

Šimonović was appointed Minister of Justice-designate of Croatia by PM Ivo Sanader on 6 October 2008. His predecessor, Ana Lovrin, had resigned the same day following a series of unsolved assaults and murders linked to Croatian organized crime that culminated with the murder of Ivana Hodak, daughter of controversial Croatian lawyer Zvonimir Hodak. However, it turned out that she was killed by a homeless man, in some apparent act of retaliation against her father.

In May 2010 Šimonović was appointed by the United Nations Secretary-General Ban Ki-moon as the Assistant Secretary-General for Human Rights. In October 2016, Šimonović has been appointed as the Secretary-General’s Special Adviser on the Responsibility to Protect. In 2019 he was reappointed Croatian Ambassador to the UN. In 2023 he serves as Chair of the United Nations Peacebuilding Commission.

== Academic career ==
Since September 1986, Šimonović has been employed at the Faculty of Law in Zagreb. He was head of the Department of Legal Theory, Vice-Dean of the Faculty of Law in Zagreb and Vice-Rector of the University of Zagreb. Before, he worked at the Institute for Social Research at the University of Zagreb. In 2004, he became a professor at the University of Zagreb Law School, where he teaches general theory of law and state, human rights and atrocity crime prevention, and international relations.

He has been a visiting lecturer at the Faculty of Law in Graz and at Yale University Law School in the United States.

== Awards ==
Šimonović was awarded the Officer of the Legion of Honour of the French Republic.
