= Ministry of Justice, Public Administration and Digital Transformation (Croatia) =

Ministry of the Croatian government

Ministry of Justice, Public Administration and Digital Transformation Ministarstvo pravosuđa, uprave i digitalne transformacije

Ministry overview
- Formed: 31 May 1990; 36 years ago
- Type: Ministry in the Government of Croatia
- Jurisdiction: Croatia
- Headquarters: Ulica grada Vukovara 49, Zagreb, Croatia
- Employees: 954 (2025 estimate)
- Budget: €654 million (2025 budget)
- Website: mpudt.gov.hr

Minister
- Currently: Damir Habijan since 17 May 2024

The Ministry of Justice, Public Administration and Digital Transformation of the Republic of Croatia (Croatian: Ministarstvo pravosuđa, uprave i digitalne transformacije) is the ministry in the Government of Croatia which is in charge of prosecuting government cases and the administration of institutions falling within the scope of the judiciary system (courts, prisons, etc.), and in charge of the system and organization of state administration and local and regional governments, political and electoral system, personal status of citizens and other activities within its jurisdiction.

== List of ministers ==
=== Ministers of Justice (1990–2020) ===
Minister	Party	Term start	Term end	Days in office
Branko Babac	HDZ	28 June 1990	17 July 1991	384
Bosiljko Mišetić	HDZ	2 Aug 1991	14 May 1992	286
Ivan Milas	HDZ	8 June 1992	12 August 1992	65
Ivica Crnić	HDZ	12 August 1992	18 May 1995	1,009
Miroslav Šeparović	HDZ	18 May 1995	20 April 1998	1,068
Milan Ramljak	HDZ	14 May 1998	13 Apr 1999	334
Zvonimir Šeparović	HDZ	15 April 1999	27 January 2000	287
Stjepan Ivanišević	SDP	27 January 2000	27 September 2001	609
Ingrid Antičević-Marinović	SDP	28 September 2001	23 December 2003	816
Vesna Škare-Ožbolt	DC	23 December 2003	9 February 2006	779
Ana Lovrin	HDZ	10 February 2006	10 October 2008	973
Ivan Šimonović	Ind.	10 October 2008	7 July 2010	635
Dražen Bošnjaković	HDZ	7 July 2010	23 December 2011	534
Orsat Miljenić	SDP	23 December 2011	22 January 2016	1,491
Ante Šprlje	MOST	22 January 2016	27 April 2017	462
Kristian Turkalj (acting)	HDZ	28 April 2017	9 June 2017	42
Dražen Bošnjaković (2nd term)	HDZ	9 June 2017	23 July 2020	1,140

=== Ministers of Justice and Public Administration (2020–2024) ===
Minister	Party	Term start	Term end	Days in office
Ivan Malenica	HDZ	24 July 2020	17 May 2024	1,393

=== Ministers of Justice, Public Administration and Digital Transformation (2024–present) ===
Minister	Party	Term start	Term end	Days in office
Damir Habijan	HDZ	17 May 2024	Incumbent	809

== See also ==
- Justice ministry
- Politics of Croatia
