= Vladimir Stipetić =

Croatian economist, academician, university professor and rector

Vladimir Stipetić (27 January 1928 – 23 July 2017) was a Croatian economist, academician, former university professor and rector of the University of Zagreb.

Stipetić was born in Zagreb. He graduated from the University of Zagreb Faculty of Economics in 1951 and earned a doctorate at the same institution in 1956. Between 1951 and 1960 he worked at Radio Zagreb, the Zagreb Institute of Economics and the Federal Institute for Economic Planning (Croatian Savezni zavod za privredno planiranje). Between 1970 and 1971 he served as dean of the Faculty of Economy and then as rector of the University of Zagreb for three years from 1986 to 1989.

He also held posts in various governmental bodies of SR Croatia and Yugoslavia. Stipetić became a member of the Croatian Academy of Sciences and Arts in 1973 and in 2000 he was made an honorary professor emeritus of the University of Zagreb. Stipetić also published some 30 books dealing with Yugoslav economics and agrarian economy.

== Sources ==
- Biography at the University of Zagreb website (in Croatian)

Preceded by Zvonimir Krajina	Rector of the University of Zagreb; 1986 – 1989	Succeeded by Zvonimir Šeparović
