= Zdenko Škrabalo =

Croatian physician and diplomat

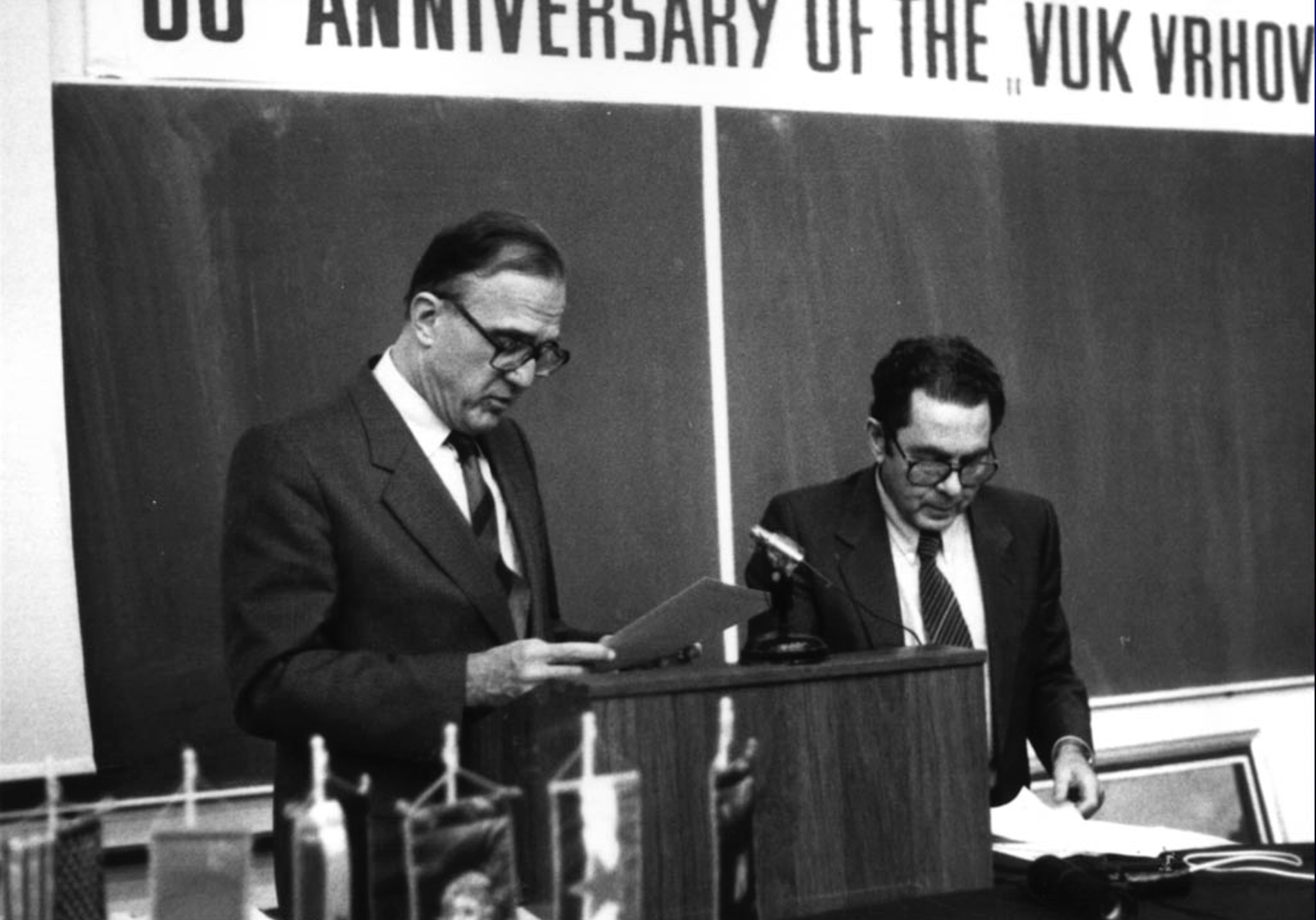

Minister of Foreign Affairs
- In office 9 June 1992 – 28 May 1993
- Prime Minister: Hrvoje Šarinić
- Preceded by: Zvonimir Šeparović
- Succeeded by: Mate Granić

Personal details
- Born: 4 August 1929 Sombor, Kingdom of Serbs, Croats and Slovenes (modern Serbia)
- Died: 12 January 2014 (aged 84) Zagreb, Croatia
- Party: Croatian Democratic Union
- Education: University of Zagreb

Zdenko Škrabalo (4 August 1929 – 12 January 2014) was a Croatian physician, academician and diplomat and former foreign minister of Croatia.

== Medical career ==
After finishing high school in his home town of Sombor, Škrabalo enrolled at the University of Zagreb School of Medicine, and graduated in 1953, where he also received a doctorate with a thesis on disorders of endocrine glands. He attended several seminars around Germany, and he founded the first German laboratory for the cytopathology of endocrine glands. He also attended seminars at medical schools in London, Leuven, Boston and Toronto. In 1976, he became full professor at the Zagreb University School of Medicine. He was also a guest lecturer at universities in Dacca, Boston, Hamburg, Frankfurt and Valletta.

He spent his career at the Vuk Vrhovac University Clinic, which he founded and developed into an internationally known center for diabetes, as well as a collaborative institution of the World Health Organization.

Škrabalo also worked for the World Health Organization as an advisor to various bodies concerned with diabetes treatment. He is notable for being the first researcher who described the parasitic disease piroplasmosis in humans and his later research was concerned with thyroid pathology, andrology and diabetes. He authored over 250 research articles and is a member of numerous Croatian and international physicians' associations. He was also a member of the Croatian Academy of Sciences and Arts since 1992.

== Political career ==
Škrabalo became engaged in politics in the early 1990s and between 1991 and 1992, he was advisor to the President of Croatia Franjo Tuđman for dealing with specialised agencies of the United Nations. From 1992 to 1993, he was appointed Minister of Foreign Affairs, and after that he served as Croatia's ambassador to Switzerland and Liechtenstein (1993–1995). In 1995, he was awarded the honorary title of professor emeritus of the University of Zagreb and from 1996 to 2000, he served as ambassador to Hungary. In 2000 Škrabalo went into retirement.

== Personal life ==
His younger brother Ivo Škrabalo was also active in Croatian politics, but in the Croatian Social Liberal Party.

On 12 January 2014, he died at Zagreb.
