= Lumbarda =

Village and municipality of Croatia

- Municipality
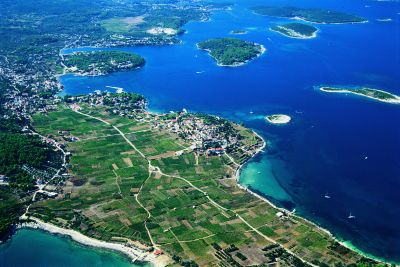
- Panorama of Lumbarda

- Location within Croatia
- Country: Croatia
- County: Dubrovnik-Neretva County

Area
  - Total: 4.1 sq mi (10.7 km^{2})

Population (2021)
  - Total: 1,209
  - Density: 293/sq mi (113/km^{2})
- Time zone: UTC+1 (CET)
  - Summer (DST): UTC+2 (CEST)

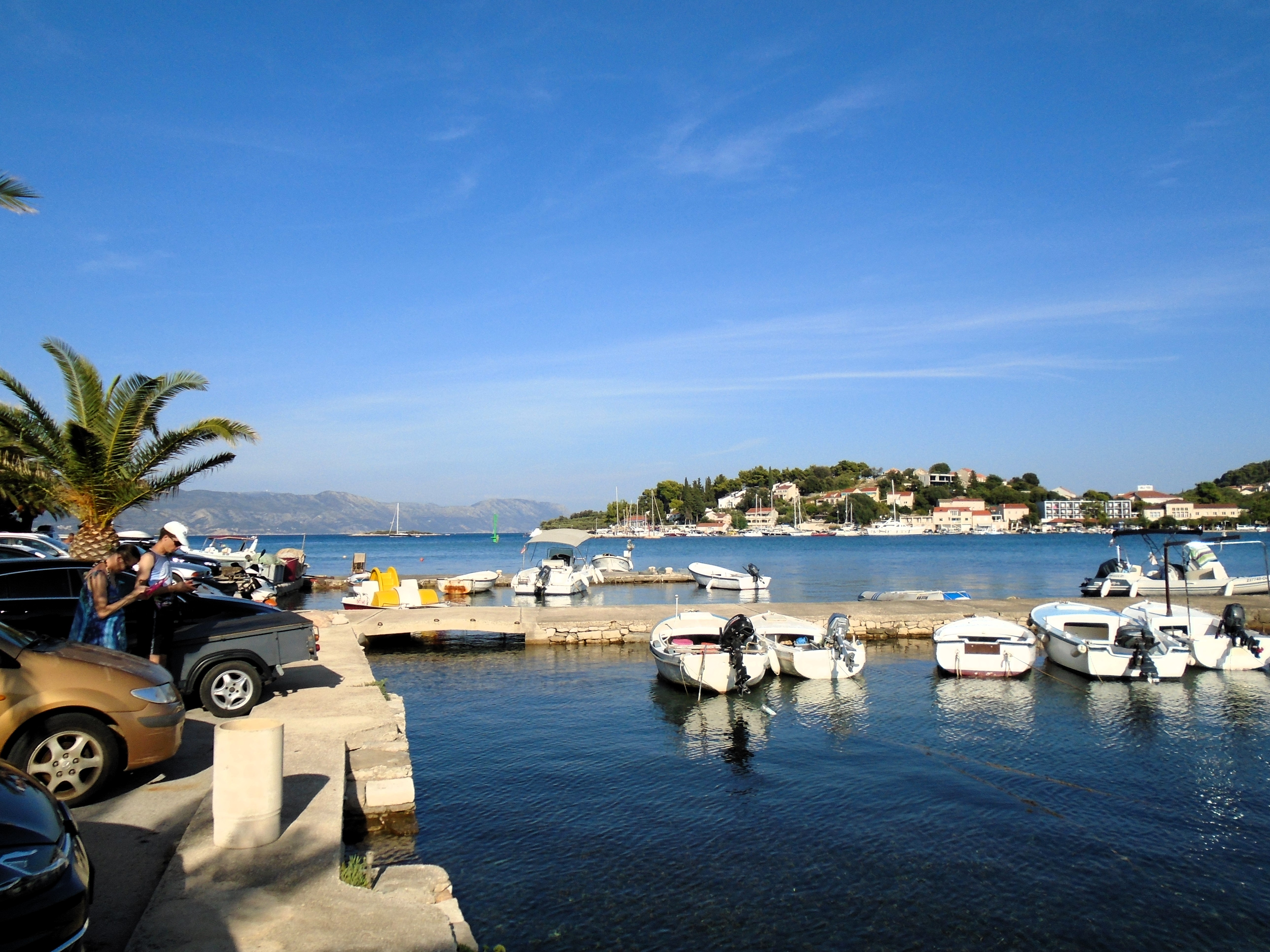
Lumbarda harbour

Lumbarda is a village and a municipality located on the eastern tip of the island of Korčula in Croatia, seven kilometers away from the town of Korčula. A road passing through a picturesque area of pine woods and olive groves connects these two places. Lumbarda is surrounded by sandy vineyards (famous white wine "Grk" produced from the native grape of the same name) and sandy beaches such as Vela Pržina, Bilin Žal and Tatinja. Lumbarda is a tourist centre, many of its 1,200 inhabitants are active in the local tourist service (private accommodation, tourist excursion to islands Mljet and Lastovo and around islands of Korčula archipelago, scuba diving excursions etc.) but they are also wine-growers, fishermen and stone-dressers. Lumbarda has a rich history preserved in written documents dating back to more than 2,000 years ago.

== History ==
Throughout its history, Lumbarda was a region combining various nations and cultures. Based on current research, the first inhabitants were the Illyrians, ruling the island during the Bronze and Iron Age. Their artifacts can be found in the graves and strategic stone stacks, concentrated primarily on the western areas of Lumbarda. Today you can find many geographical toponyms with the name Lumbardhë in Albania and Kosovo, Lumbardhë meaning white river.

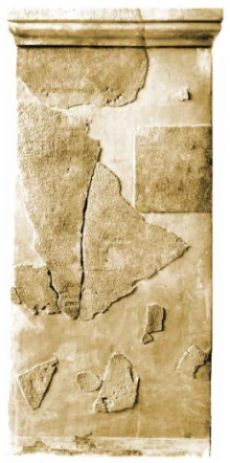
Lumbarda Psephisma

With the intrusion of Greek interests on the Adriatic, the island relinquished its historical obliviousness becoming known as Korkyra Melaina (black). The region was of great importance to the Greeks, establishing two settlements on the Black Korkiri. The later settlement was founded in the 3rd century in Lumbarda. The most renowned and significant Antic stone inscriptions found in the Republic of Croatia give witness to this historical event.

The Lumbarda Psephisma is kept in the Archaeological Museum in Zagreb. The decree details the particular details surrounding the establishment of the colony. The text, amongst other things, provides information on the Greeks from the island of Issa (today Vis) establishing the settlement on the basis of a prior agreement with the representatives of the local Illyrii, Pil and his son Daz. The Lumbarda Psephisma was discovered on the top of the hill Koludrt, where the Issian town most likely once stood. Somewhat south, in the Sutivan area, is located the necropolis colony from which originate Greek vases, now kept in the Korčula Town Museum.

The Greek colony designated the beginning of the end of the Illyrian era on Korčula, but their real downfall occurred during the invasion by the Roman Emperor Octavian in 35 B.C. Very soon following this dramatic event, the first Roman families arrived on the island. One of these families owned a spacious villa dating back to the first century, and located in Knežina region in the Lumbardian Veli area. Other than the building's total area, it is particularly significant due to the way it was built – made of small pyramidal blocks placed in a slanted net. The technique is opus reticulatum, typical for the Roman regions in Italy, hence the Lumbardian villa is a unique case on the eastern Adriatic coast. The significant Roman remains are also to be found in the Koludrt and Sutivan regions. In the later, a thermal facility belonging to a smaller settlement with a respective necropolis was discovered. Furthermore, in the Lumdardian aquarium there is evidence of a Roman quarry on the islands of Sutvara, Vrnik and Kamenjak. The latter Antic age was preserved in the region mainly through remains relating to the early Christian age. Of all the remains, the best preserved is the chapel of St. Barbara on the island of Sutvara, dating to the 6th century. In the 6th century Lumbadara came under Byzantine rule.

The lack of early Middle Ages ruins confirms the theory that with the fall of the Antic age, Lumbarda was all but abandoned (and later resettled). Its current name first appears in the statute of Korčula, originally compiled in 1214 (suggesting a presence of a trading post) . Consequently, one of the provisions of the statute prohibits the permanent settlement of Lumbarda and imposes a monetary fine for those staying over night. As per its flat sandy topography, two quite bays and its previous church holdings (in the form of land fraternities), it is possible that the trading post in question developed as a reaction to the local Catholic church's dwindling income. Border disputes with the Republic of Dubrovnik and the Diocese of Ston might have left Korcula council & its church council under a financial hardship. In this respect, the monetary fine imposed on anyone who stayed in the vicinity after dark, might have been a toll levied on respective traders anchored in the bay. In such a scenario it is quite possible that the name in question could be a version of the word Lombard, as a reference to a centre of business demarcated by commodities based collateral. It further suggests a tangible link to North Italy, the Lombard League, the Republic of Venice and the presence of Lombard Dalmatian trade.

It is not surprising therefore that the only witnesses of that time are two sacral buildings, the church of St. John on Sutivan and St. Barbara on Žabnjak. The former is the oldest church in Lumbarda, (since it is mentioned in 1388 as a ruin). It was renovated a few times, until 1893 when a new church was built on its ruins. The church of St. Barbara on Žabnjak was most likely built toward the end of the 13th century, and it also was renovated, first in 1728, and once again toward the end of the 19th century when it received its present form.

In 1420, Korčula came under the long authority of the Venetian Republic and since then it has shared its history with Dalmatia. With the stabilization of existential circumstances began the continual settling of Lumbarda. In the 16th century, it was a formed settlement, grouped around churches built mainly on private land of the Korčulan nobles. The oldest of them all is the church of St ROK in Vela Glavica. It was probably built at the beginning of the 16th century, since its expansion is mentioned in 1561. It received its present form in 1886, while the bell-tower was erected in 1996. In the 16th century, the church of St Barthol in Vela Postrana was erected, the church of St. Peter and Paul in Vela Glavica, the church of Mary's Visitation (Gospica) in Mala Glavica, and the church of the Holy Cross in the field. The later was renovated in 1774, while a lodge was added in 1881 to accommodate the increasing number of parishioners, during the expansion of the main church in Vela Glavica.

The parish of Lumbarda, founded in the 16th century, is first mentioned in 1612, at the diocesan synod in Korčula. The registry books originate from the same century: matrimonial from 1620, the deceased from 1635 and the baptised from 1641.

In the 17th and 18th centuries, Lumbarda was the countryside residency for the Korčulan bishops and nobility. The first preserved summer residence belonged to the diocese and was built in the 15th century, in the cove of Bilin žal. However, two centuries later, the countryside architecture matured and the favored regions were Tatinja and Prvi žal. At that time castles were also built, which other than business, also had a defensive function. Hence, Cankin's and Nobilo's castles above the Tatinja cove, and the rook in the Veli poj, dominate the surroundings due to their height.

The 19th and 20th centuries were characterized by the formation of various religious, cultural and artistic associations. In 1857 the brotherhood of the Holy Sacrament was established, and later the brotherhoods of St. ROK and Our Lady of Karmen also joined. Traditional music was founded in 1929, while the church choir was formed in 1935. One of the last associations founded was the Cultural association "Ivo Lozica" (1980) and the girls church choir (1999).

In the early 20th century, two of the most recent sacral objects were erected in Lumbarda. They are the church of St. Špiridijun in the village of Javić dating back to 1900, and the chapel of Our Lady of Lourdes at the base of Koludrt was built in 1922.

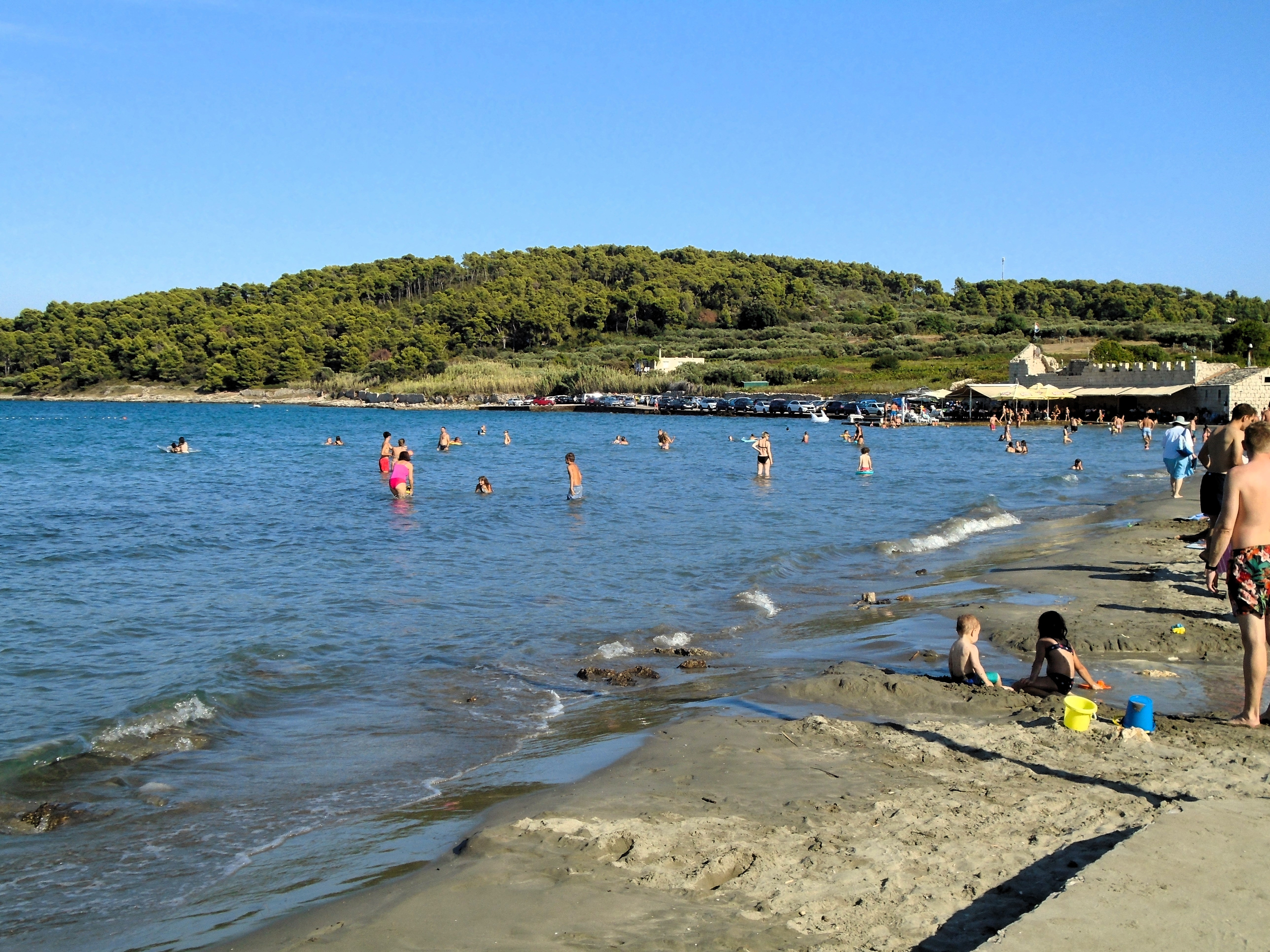
Bilin Žal Beach east of Lumbarda

== Demographics ==
Lumbarda is the only settlement in the municipality. In 2021, its population was 1209.

Lumbarda: Population trends 1857–2021
v

population	580	703	831	1029	1197	1349	1349	1243	1185	1235	1142	1068	1040	1102	1221	1213	1209
	1857	1869	1880	1890	1900	1910	1921	1931	1948	1953	1961	1971	1981	1991	2001	2011	2021

Sources: Croatian Bureau of Statistics publications

== Notable people ==
Numerous Lumbardian artists made a significant contribution to this region, some of whom gained world recognition. They include the sculptors Frano Kršinić (1897-1982), Ivo Lozica (1910-1943), Lujo Lozica (born 1934), an amateur sculptor Ivan Jurjević - Knez (born 1920), painter Stipe Nobilo (born 1945), composer Ivo Lipanović (born 1958), actor Damir Markovina (born 1973) and the village mascot simply known as Renato or Rex (born 1969). Also, journalist and US Foreign Service officer Sipe "Steve" Sestanovich (1912–2014) was born in Lumbarda.

== See also ==
- Lumbarda Psephisma
- Croatia
- Korčula
- Dalmatia
