= Vladimir Drobnjak =

Croatian diplomat

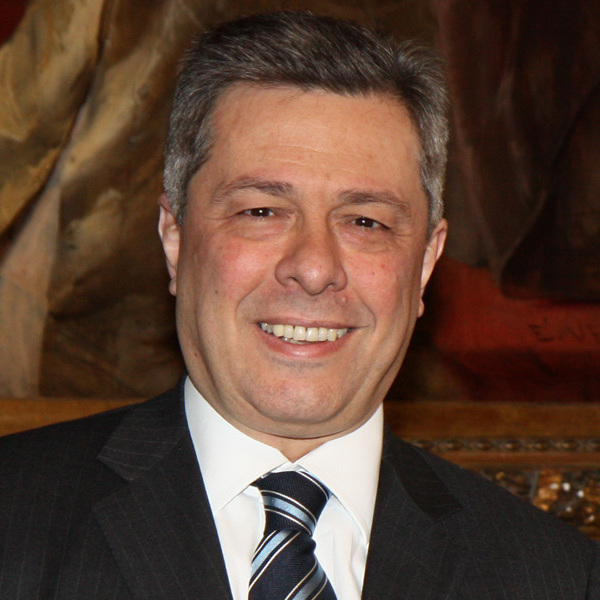

Permanent Representative to the United Nations of Croatia
- In office 1 August 2013 – 15 February 2020
- Preceded by: Ranko Vilović
- In office 1 July 2003 – 27 April 2005
- Preceded by: Ivan Šimonović
- Succeeded by: Mirjana Mladineo

Personal details
- Born: 5 March 1956 (age 70) Zagreb, SR Croatia, SFR Yugoslavia
- Profession: Diplomat

Vladimir Drobnjak (born 5 March 1956) is a Croatian diplomat who is the current Permanent Representative of Croatia to the United Nations, since 2013.

== Biography ==
Born in Zagreb in the Socialist Federal Republic of Yugoslavia, Drobnjak graduated from the University of Zagreb Law School. He worked as a radio and newspaper correspondent from 1986 until 1992, when he joined the foreign service. His first position was Deputy Permanent Representative to the UN in New York City. Since then Drobnjak held various posts regarding Croatia's relations with the European Union. From 2012 until 2013 he was the head of the Croatian mission to the EU and then the permanent representative of Croatia to the EU after it joined. In August 2013, he was appointed the Permanent Representative of Croatia to the UN. In January 2014 Drobnjak became the Vice President of the UN Economic and Social Council.
