= Ante Šprlje =

Croatian lawyer and politician

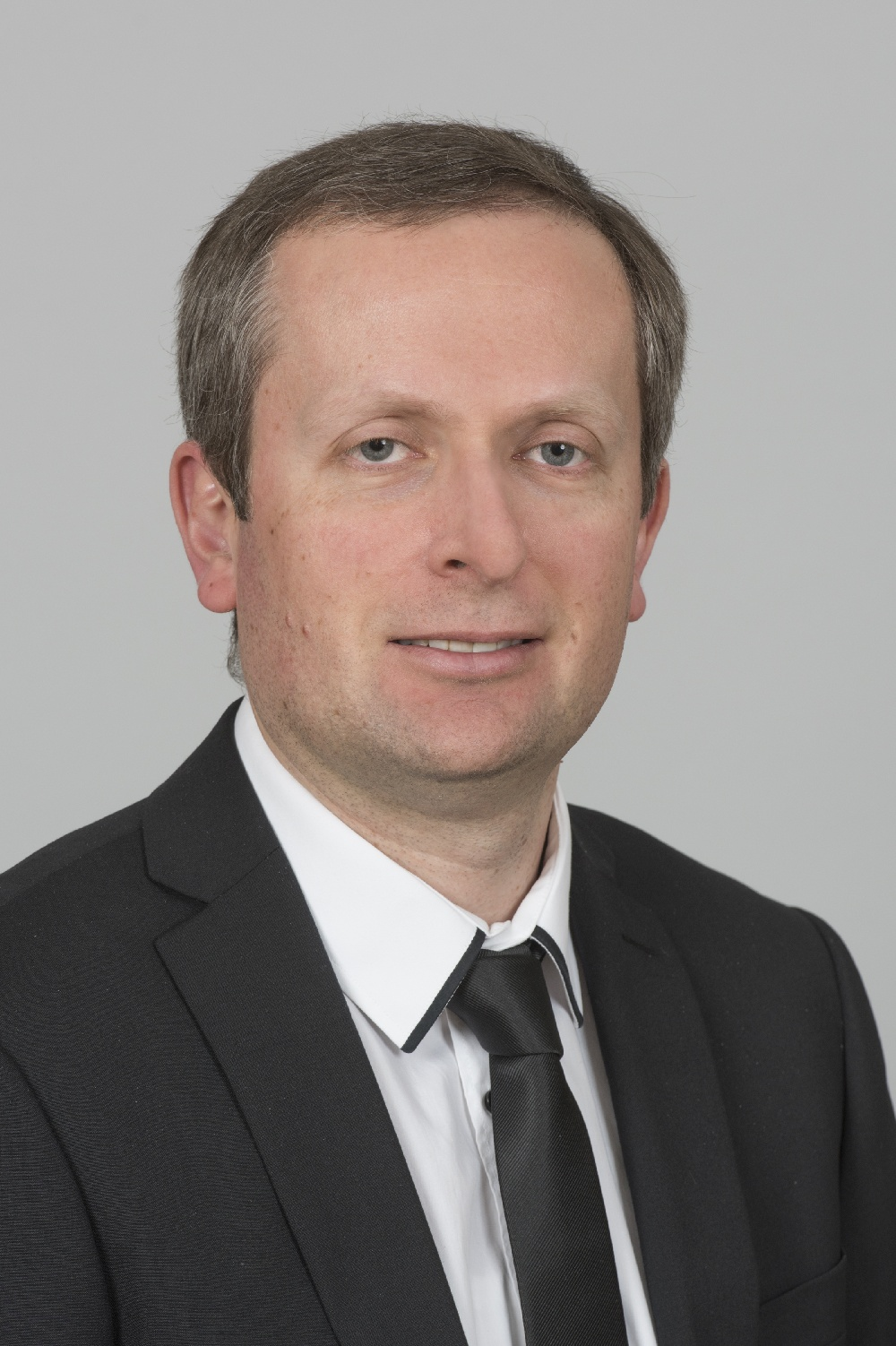

Minister of Justice
- In office 22 January 2016 – 27 April 2017
- President: Kolinda Grabar-Kitarović
- Prime Minister: Tihomir Orešković; Andrej Plenković
- Preceded by: Orsat Miljenić
- Succeeded by: Kristian Turkalj (acting)

Personal details
- Born: 20 August 1979 (age 47) Metković, SR Croatia, SFR Yugoslavia (modern Croatia)
- Party: None
- Spouse: Iva Šprlje
- Children: 2
- Education: University of Split

Ante Šprlje (born 20 August 1979) is a Croatian lawyer who served as the Minister of Justice in the cabinets of Prime Ministers Tihomir Orešković and Andrej Plenković from 22 January 2016 until being dismissed by Plenković on 27 April 2017.

== Early life and education ==
Ante Šprlje was born on 28 August 1979 in the village of Matijevići near Metković to Mate and Maša Šprlje. He finished elementary and high school in Metković. He finished 7th grade in Zagreb due to the ongoing Croatian War of Independence. After finishing high school he enrolled in the Faculty of Law of the University of Split from which he graduated in 2002. He passed state exam in 2005, and bar exam in 2007.

== Career ==
Šprlje got his first job in October 2003 when he was appointed research assistant in the government of the Dubrovnik-Neretva County. He worked on this position until February 2005. From April 2005 until December 2007 he worked as trainee in State Attorney's Office in Metković. In December 2007 he began working as legal adviser in the Metković Municipal court. He worked there until August 2012 when he was appointed judge. From January 2015 until April 2015, he served as a Vice President of the same court. In January 2016 he became Minister of Justice in the Bridge of Independent Lists quota for the Cabinet of Tihomir Orešković.

He served, in most cases as a volunteer, in the following: leading the campaign for the "[d]evelopment and protection of the natural heritage of the valley of the Neretva river" (2006), as consultant for the Regional Environmental Center for Central and Eastern Europe (2007-2009), as a volunteer in the Fire Department of Kula Norinska municipality (2012-2016), as editor of the Kula Norinska municipality official website (2012-2015), as a school board member in the Kula Norinska elementary school system, as vice-president (2008-2009) and, later, as president (2009) of the Neretvian Lađa Marathon Association, as Vice President/Secretary of the Neretva Delta forum (2008-2013), as Chairman of the Supervisory Board of the Association of Neretva Boatmen (2012-2014), President of the association "Nora", and four years rower on the Neretvian Lađa Marathon (2007-2015), moderator of criminal and misdemeanor law sub-forum (2007-2012), and as editor of the regulations of Legalis.hr, an online legal portal (2007-2012), as president of the election commission of Kula Norinska municipality (2007-2010), as a member of the election commission of Metković, and as presiding judge of the Civil Service Tribunal in Dubrovnik-Neretva County.

Šprlje served as the Minister of Justice in the Cabinet of Tihomir Orešković since January 22, 2016. He retained his position in the Cabinet of Andrej Plenković, inaugurated in October 2016.

== Personal life ==
Šprlje has a daughter with his wife Iva. The couple are expecting a second child. He speaks Croatian, English and German.
