= Amand Lucas =

- Born: 18 December 1936 (age 89)
- Occupations: Scientist and Professor

Amand Lucas (born 18 December 1936, Liège) is a Belgian scientist and professor at the Facultés Universitaires Notre-Dame de la Paix, at the Institute for Studies in Interface Sciences. In 1985, he was awarded the Francqui Prize on Exact Sciences for his work on theoretical physics. He is a member of the Académie Royale de Belgique, Academia Europaea and a Fellow of the American Physical Society.

He was born in Liege in 1936, and attended the Ecole Normale pour Instituteurs from 1952-1956. Following this he did his undergraduate studies at the University de Liege from 1956-1960, followed by a PhD with J Pirenne from 1962-1966. He then moved to Battelle Memorial Institute for postdoctoral work in 1967-1968, and after a couple of visiting scientist positions became a professor at Facultés Universitaire Notre-Dame de la Paix in 1974.
