= 2009–10 Croatian presidential election =

- 27 December 2009 (first round); 10 January 2010 (second round)
- Turnout: 43.94% (first round), 50.12% (second round)
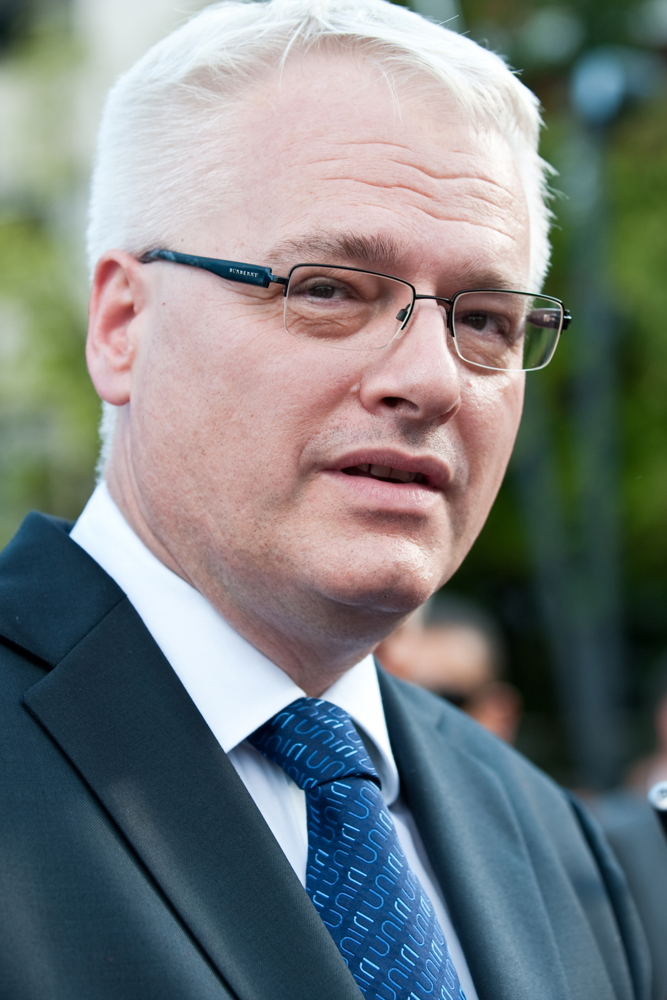

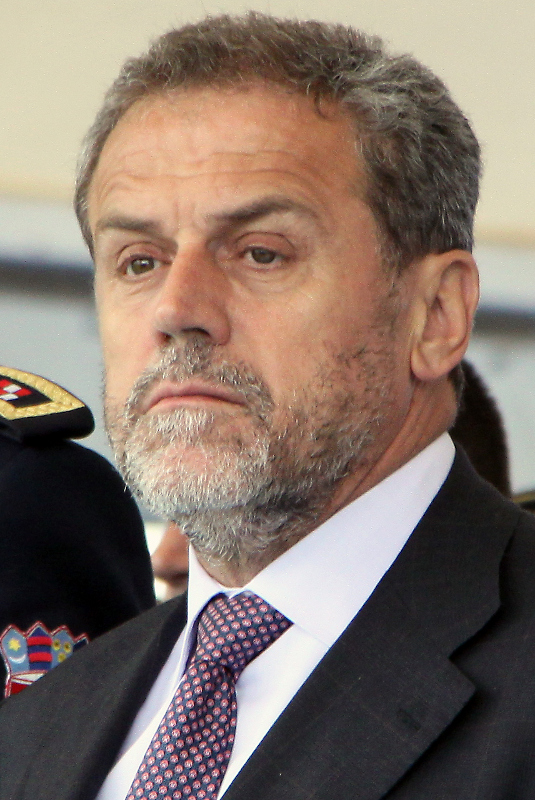
Nominee	Ivo Josipović	Milan Bandić
Party	SDP	Independent
Popular vote	1,339,385	883,222
Percentage	60.26%	39.74%
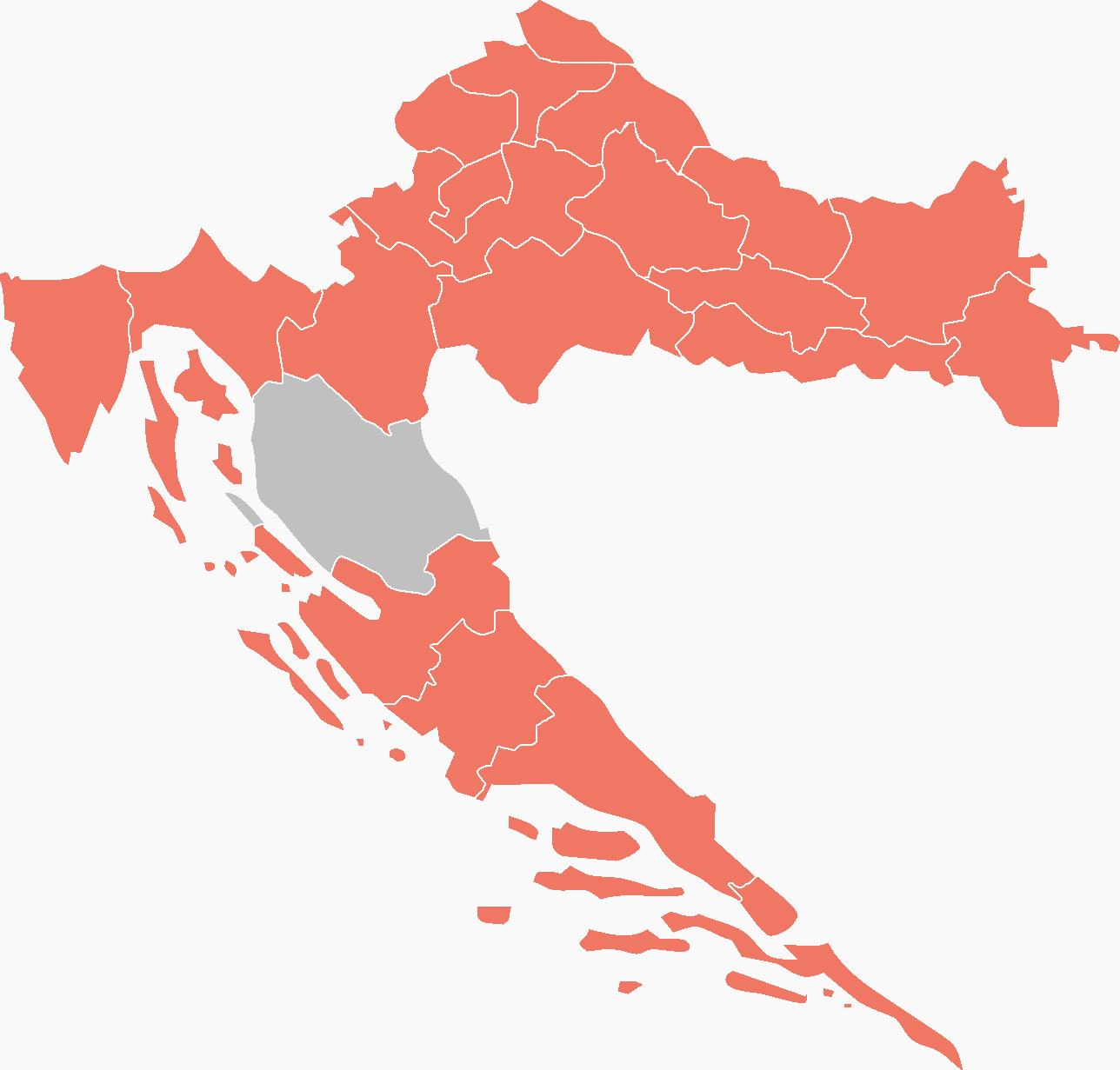
- Second round results by county
President before election
Stjepan Mesić
Independent
Elected President
Ivo Josipović
SDP

Presidential elections were held in Croatia on 27 December 2009 and 10 January 2010. Twelve candidates participated in the first round, prior to a run-off between first-round winner Ivo Josipović and runner-up Milan Bandić. In the run-off, Josipović won a landslide victory, receiving 60.3% of the vote becoming the first elected president nominated by the Social Democratic Party of Croatia (SDP). The incumbent president Stjepan Mesić, who was first elected in 2000 as the candidate of the Croatian People's Party and re-elected in 2005 as an independent, was ineligible to seek re-election to a third term due to term limits.

As the incumbent was ineligible for re-election, several candidates took the opportunity to run for the presidency. Most mainstream Croatian political parties participated in the elections either by nominating a candidate or endorsing one. The relatively low nomination threshold (ten thousand signatures in a country of four million voters), turmoil in the largest political party (Croatian Democratic Union, HDZ) due to the departure of long-time leader Ivo Sanader and the ongoing economic crisis, as well as a significant one-man revolt in the second-largest party (Social Democratic Party of Croatia, SDP), led to a record number of candidates contesting the elections.

In the first round, the left of centre vote was split between 3–4 candidates, while the right of centre vote was split between 5–6 candidates. Owing to the increased fragmentation of the right, two candidates who were both long-time members of SDP progressed to the run-off. The election polls accurately predicted the winner, while the runner-up projections were usually within a statistical margin of error, lifting many candidates' hopes and enabling a sense of drama stirred by the Croatian media.

The second round was marked by more intense polarization. The Bandić campaign shifted their political message significantly to the right, with the Josipović campaign put on the defensive. However, a sudden reappearance of Sanader interrupted the election campaign and cemented Josipović's advantage; in the end, he won by a large margin, and was inaugurated as the third President of the Republic of Croatia on 18 February.

== Background and rules ==
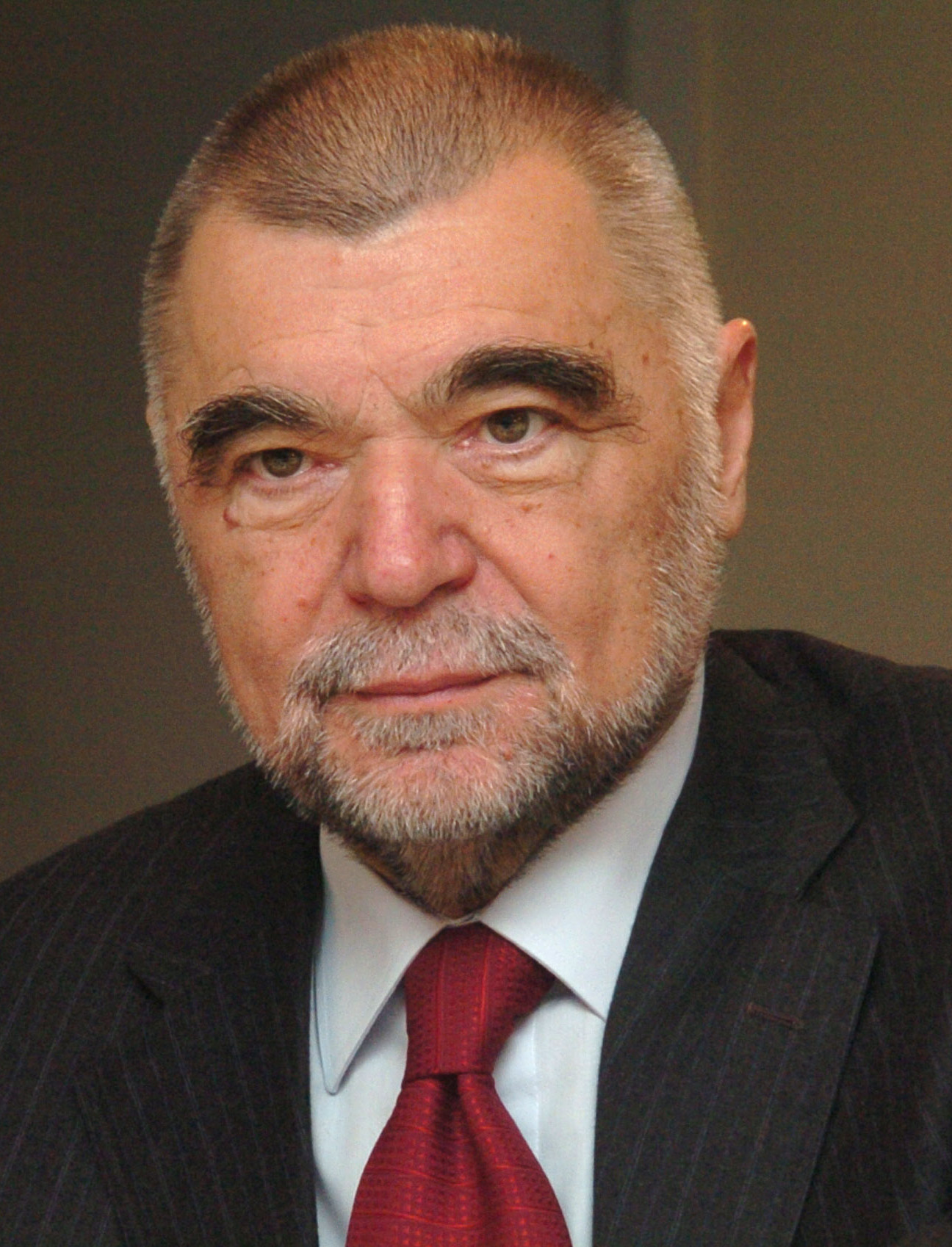
Stjepan Mesić, the term-limited incumbent president whose term expired on 18 February 2010.

After serving two consecutive five-year terms, the incumbent president Stjepan Mesić was not eligible to run in the 2009 election.

The elections officially began on 4 November, with the start of the period for the collecting of signatures needed to become an official candidate. Each candidate had 12 days to collect 10,000 written signatures from citizens who are eligible to vote. After the 12 days expired, the signatures were verified and on November 18 the State Electoral Commission announced the 12 candidates that managed to collect the necessary number of signatures. The next day the official 37-day campaign began and went until 24 hours before Election Day, which happened to be Christmas Day, midnight.

The first round was held on 27 December and no candidate managed to obtain 50% + one vote, so a second round was held on 10 January 2010 between the two candidates that achieved the most votes, Ivo Josipović and Milan Bandić. Each candidate could have withdrawn from the election at any time.

== Campaign before the official start ==
Although officially the campaign started on 19 November, in reality it began as early as summer of 2009. The main political parties had not yet announced their nominees for president in the summer, but certain high-ranking politicians had expressed their interest in running very early.

The governing HDZ saw considerable drama in selecting their candidate for president. Ever since late 2008, there was much speculation that prime minister Ivo Sanader would run for the presidency, although he frequently denied such speculation. After the local elections, the speculation grew as no other candidates publicly hinted they would run. However, Ivo Sanader unexpectedly decided not only to not run for the presidency, but to resign as prime minister and retire from active politics altogether, announcing his decision on 1 July 2009.

Sanader nominated Andrija Hebrang as the party's candidate for president, a decision that was backed by the remainder of the party's presidency after a while, but not before widespread rumours started about the HDZ member Nadan Vidošević, a prominent businessman, being the presidency's favorite candidate. Vidošević however rejected these claims. Hebrang also hesitated before accepting the party nomination, explaining it with health reasons. Vidošević formally announced his bid as an independent candidate on September 2, and was expelled from his party soon after that. Also, Ivo Sanader was not the only member of the cabinet to resign as Minister of Education Dragan Primorac also announced his retirement on the very same day as the prime minister. There was much speculation that Primorac resigned as he was not his party's candidate for president and that he resigned so he could run as an independent. The speculation proved to be true and Primorac announced his candidacy on 9 November 2009. He was then also ejected from HDZ membership.

The Social Democratic Party of Croatia also saw some controversy in the process of nominating a candidate. Immediately after the 2009 local elections and Milan Bandić's landslide victory in Zagreb as a candidate of the Social Democrats, there was much talk of his potential candidacy for president. Before the election, many influential members of SDP urged Zoran Milanović, the president of the party, to intervene and nominate someone other than Bandić, referring to numerous corruption and malversation allegations made against him during his tenure as the mayor of Zagreb. However, Milanović denied the widespread rumours about internal turmoil and publicly supported Milan Bandić in the mayoral campaign, making him the target of an open letter signed by many prominent left-wing intellectuals, in which they attacked Bandić and endorsed Josip Kregar. Although Milanović dismissed these charges, SDP conspicuously put Bandić at the bottom of the electoral list for the city council, which prompted further accusations of hypocrisy from their opponents.

On 20 June the SDP presidency chose two of their members of parliament as candidates for the SDP nomination: Ivo Josipović, a law professor and known jurist, and Ljubo Jurčić, an economics professor and former Minister of the Economy, Labour and Entrepreneurship. Other candidates were allowed to be submitted, however, Milan Bandić refused. On 12 July a primary election was held between the two social democrats and Ivo Josipović won with 64.78% of the vote from around ten thousand party members.

However, the 'Bandić problem' escalated in the coming months as the media continued to speculate about his potential candidacy. Bandić started to travel throughout Croatia without a stated common agenda, and the press followed his every step and constantly asked him if he would run for the presidency. He consistently refused to comment, drawing more and more media attention with his indecisiveness. Finally, the drama was concluded when he officially announced his candidacy for president in a speech on 5 November at 7 am on Sljeme criticizing Zoran Milanović and his former party for turning against him saying that he was one of the founders of SDP emphasizing that he stood with the party through the good and the bad times. Bandić was automatically expelled from SDP, losing his position as a member of party's presidency and leader of the Zagreb branch of SDP. Despite that, he declared on Croatian national television HRT that he still finds himself as true Social Democrat and that he'll proudly keep his SDP membership card nr. 2. SDP later made a statement that Bandić's membership card number was 38159.

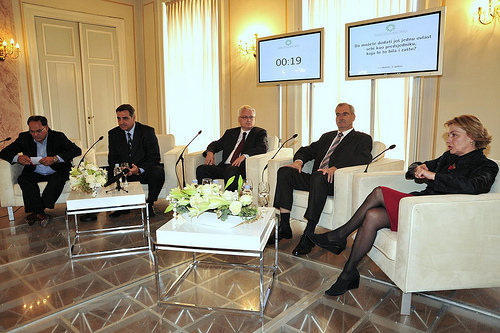
Round table discussion with the candidates. From left to right: Damir Kajin, Nadan Vidošević, Ivo Josipović, Andrija Hebrang, Vesna Pusić

By the time the nominations period started, most major political parties nominated their candidates for president:

- The governing Croatian Democratic Union nominated Andrija Hebrang, a former vice-president of the Croatian government and former Minister of Health and Social Services.
- The main opposition party SDP nominated Ivo Josipović, a professor of law at the University of Zagreb, a lecturer at the Zagreb Musical Academy and an SDP MP.
- The Croatian People's Party – Liberal Democrats nominated Vesna Pusić, the head of the parliamentary committee in charge of overseeing the negotiation process of Croatia and the European Union.
- The Istrian Democratic Assembly nominated Damir Kajin, their longtime representative in the Croatian Parliament.

The major independent candidates originating in the two largest parties are:

- Nadan Vidošević, the president of the Croatian Economic Chamber, formerly in HDZ
- Milan Bandić, mayor of Zagreb, formerly in SDP
- Dragan Primorac, former Minister of Education, formerly in HDZ

Several other candidates also had a history of association with major parties:

- Vesna Škare Ožbolt, former Minister of Justice, switched from HDZ to DC in 2000
- Miroslav Tuđman, former head of Central Intelligence Service, formerly in HDZ in 1990s

Political party candidates were selected within party elections, or were elected by party bodies, and they are the party's sole official candidates. All parliamentary parties have a policy to support only one candidate, and if their member announces an independent nomination, he or she automatically loses their party membership. Parliamentary parties that do not candidate their member for the president, usually publicly support someone. These parties can be listed on the electoral list for the president, but sometimes their support is just a public endorsement. Regional-right wing HDSSB supported independent candidate Milan Bandić, and regional-centrist PGS supported independent Nadan Vidošević.

After the election, the Constitution does not allow the President to be a member of any political party so he or she must resign from membership, if there is one.

== First round candidates ==
Out of 19 persons who submitted signatures to the State Electoral Commission, 13 of them were regular, but one of them withdrew. The following 12 candidates ran for Sunday, December 27, 2009, presidential elections.

Candidate	Party affiliation	Political remarks	Proof of nomination	Web site
Milan Bandić	Independent	member of SDP until nomination, running as an independent candidate a populist platform	Submitted around 60,000 received signatures to the electoral commission on November 13.	milanbandic.com
Andrija Hebrang	Croatian Democratic Union	centre-right platform	Submitted around 140,600 received signatures to the electoral commission on November 16.	hebrang.com
Ivo Josipović	Social Democratic Party of Croatia	centre-left platform focusing on justice	Submitted around 117,000 received signatures to the electoral commission on November 16.	josipovic.net
Josip Jurčević	Independent	a far-right platform	submitted 14,000 signatures to the electoral commission on November 16.	josip-jurcevic.net
Damir Kajin	Istrian Democratic Assembly	left wing platform focusing on anti-fascism and anti-establishment politics	Submitted around 17,000 received signatures to the electoral commission on November 15.	damirkajin.org
Boris Mikšić	Independent	a right wing populist history	submitted 15,000 signatures to the electoral commission on November 16.	borismiksic.net
Dragan Primorac	Independent	member of the HDZ until nomination, centre-right and a platform focusing on corruption and education.	Submitted around 35,000 received signatures to the electoral commission on November 16.	draganprimorac.com
Vesna Pusić	Croatian People's Party - Liberal Democrats	centrist and liberal platform	Submitted around 47,000 received signatures to the electoral commission on November 16.	predsjednica.com
Vesna Škare Ožbolt	Independent	running as an independent on a centrist platform, supported by DC	submitted 18,000 signatures to the electoral commission on November 16.	vesna.com.hr
Miroslav Tuđman	Independent	a right wing euro-sceptic platform	submitted 18,000 signatures to the electoral commission on November 16.	miroslav-tudjman.com
Nadan Vidošević	Independent	until nomination member of HDZ, running as an independent on a centrist platform focusing on the economy	Submitted around 31,000 signatures until November 15.	nadanvidosevic.com
Slavko Vukšić	Democratic Party of Slavonia Plain	regionalism	submitted 12,500 signatures to the electoral commission on November 16.	slavkovuksic.com

=== Valid candidates that withdrew ===
- Veljko Džakula, the leader of a non-governmental organization Serbian Democratic Forum, entered the race and became a candidate of three Croatian Serb parties: Serb People's Party, Democratic Party of Serbs and New Serb Party (Nova srpska stranka). He submitted 10,557 signatures to the electoral commission on November 16. However, he then withdrew on November 17.

=== Failed candidacies ===
- Dean Golubić announced an independent candidacy on a far right platform. He announced his withdrawal on 16 November.
- Sead Hasanović, better known as Braco Cigan, from Željko Malnar's TV-show Nightmare Stage, ran as an independent candidate. He submitted around 6,000 signatures and was rejected.
- Stjepan Kravarščan submitted only one signature to the electoral commission on November 13 and was rejected.
- Zahir Kurbašić was nominated by the Women's Democratic Party but failed to ensure an official candidature.
- Denis Latin, a popular Croatian TV journalist, announced his independent candidacy on a liberal platform, but after several months he changed his mind.
- Slobodan Midžić submitted no signatures to the electoral commission saying that he "seeks to represent a president of the SFR Yugoslavia for the election of the president of the European Union". Madžić had also failed to nominate himself for 2007 parliamentary elections since his electoral list held the name of League of Communists of Yugoslavia, the party that does not exist.
- Marija Štrajh, Croatian television host
- Jurica Tucak was the second person who came before electoral commission without signatures.
- Alka Vuica, a popular singer and songwriter, supported by Green List of Croatia – received around 8,000 signatures reporting that 1485 of her signatures were stolen and that she was offered to buy the rest of the missing votes. She subsequently withdrew her nomination.
- Božidar Vukasović announced an independent candidacy running on an anti-corruption platform. He announced his withdrawal on 16 November.

== Campaign ==
=== First round ===
The official campaign began on 19 November as the country's electoral commission announced the 12 candidates eligible to run. Andrija Hebrang collected more signatures than any other candidate with over 140,000, Ivo Josipović was second with just under 120,000, Milan Bandić collected around 60,000, Vesna Pusić just under 50,000, while Dragan Primorac and Nadan Vidošević each collected over 30,000 signatures. At the beginning of the campaign, most polls showed Josipović with a healthy lead over his opponents. Although Hebrang held the second spot in most opinion polls during the summer, he fell to as low as fifth place by November. He claimed opinion polls have never been kind to his party as most conservative voters refuse to participate in them and expressed conviction that come Election Day he will be the victor. Despite Bandić's indecisiveness, he held second or third place in most polls during autumn. After he officially announced his campaign, most political observers expected him to get a bump in the polls, however that never materialized. After announcing his candidacy he continuously dropped in the polls, but still managed to claim second or third place. Nadan Vidošević led most polls during 2008 and early 2009, but never managed to take the lead after officially becoming a candidate.

Josipović based his campaign on the slogan 'Justice for Croatia' and kicked off his campaign with a rally in front of the Croatian National Theatre in Zagreb. He attacked the current Croatian government and the prime minister Jadranka Kosor for ignoring the needs of the little man and criticized her for not dealing with corruption. Andrija Hebrang started the campaign with patriotic rhetoric with the slogan 'For a proud and European Croatia'. He praised Jadranka Kosor and her policies, mostly criticizing Dragan Primorac and Nadan Vidošević for abandoning their party, calling them deserters and traitors of their party. He argued that he offered Primorac and Vidošević an opportunity to settle the question of who will be their party's nominee for president through a primary challenge stating that they both refused.

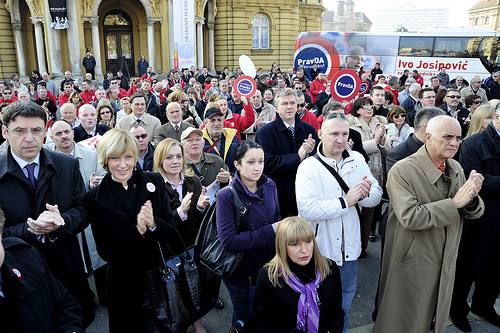
A crowd listening to Ivo Josipović speak as he begins his campaign with a rally on Marshal Tito Square in Zagreb

Nadan Vidošević used his knowledge of economic issues to gain popularity during the 2008 financial crisis. He emphasized his business success during the 1990s as well as his post as the president of the Croatian Economic Chamber (CEC). However, the press continuously raised the subject of his estate and property and how was he able to amass such an enormous wealth in a short period of time. He usually responded saying that everything he has he built with hard work and smart business moves. On 9 December Dragan Primorac accused Vidošević of nepotism and criminal, claiming that he employed three of his nephews in the CEC and that his secretary was related to him. Vidošević responded by saying he does not need someone who hits women teaching him moral lessons referring to allegations made to Primorac long ago which claimed he beat his former partner. Primorac accused Vidošević of lying and threatened a lawsuit if he did not apologize to him and his wife. During a debate held on 10 December Primorac and Vidošević exchanged insults, Vidošević repeating his allegations and Primorac demanding an apology. Finally, on 14 December Primorac announced he will be pressing charges against Vidošević claiming he caused great emotional damage to him and especially his wife. Vidošević responded by saying Primorac would do anything to gain attention saying his campaign was falling apart.

Milan Bandić avoided most debates saying he was a man of work, not of words. Most political pundits, however, thought he was afraid of confronting the other candidates as he usually tends to perform badly in debates. He based his campaign on the message that he was just one of the people, not an intellectual, but an ordinary hardworking patriot. Vesna Pusić heavily emphasized her gender in the campaign claiming it was time for a woman to make it to Pantovčak. Most commentators noticed she made the biggest change of image during the campaign out of all candidates claiming she lost her strict appearance of a professor becoming more accessible and open about her personal life. She based her campaign on her liberal and pro-European positions as well as her foreign policy experience.

The presentation of candidates on national television is customarily a contentious issue, with minor candidates complaining of lack of coverage and the major candidates complaining about dilution of campaign on fringe issues. Croatian Radiotelevision, as the public television operator, is legally obliged to give each candidate equal airtime, and they all got a half-hour interview in the late prime-time political show "Otvoreno". There were three televised debates held in the first round. The first was held on 20 November on HRT with 10 candidates present. Andrija Hebrang and Boris Mikšić refused to attend claiming they were discriminated on all national television networks. The second was held on 10 December on Nova TV hosted by Mislav Bago. Five candidates that were ahead in the polls were present, Ivo Josipović, Nadan Vidošević, Andrija Hebrang, Dragan Primorac and Vesna Pusić. Milan Bandić refused to attend. The main topics were the fight against corruption, the economy and the European Union. A poll conducted after the debate showed Vesna Pusić won the debate with 30% of those polled responding she did best, with Ivo Josipović coming in second with 26%. The poll also showed Ivo Josipović was the most specific in his answers with Vesna Pusić following closely. The audience considered Nadan Vidošević the most likable and Andrija Hebrang the most entertaining. The final debate was once again held on HRT on 22 December and was the only one with all 12 candidates present. The main topics of discussion were campaign spending, corruption and the suggestion of removing political immunity. There were four debates planned with the final one to be held on Nova TV on 23 December with six major candidates to be present. However, the six candidates behind in the polls objected saying they were discriminated by Nova TV, particularly Josip Jurčević who threatened to sue the television station and filed a complaint against it to the country's electoral commission. Finally, Nova TV canceled the scheduled debate and called for the change of Croatia's laws concerning media coverage of presidential campaigns.

==== Endorsements ====
- Milan Bandić
  - Croatian Democratic Alliance of Slavonia and Baranja (HDSSB)
  - List of known athletes and people from show business including: Iva Majoli, Sanja Jovanović, Vlado Šola, Rade Šerbedžija, Boris Novković and Mia Begović
- Ivo Josipović
  - Josip Kregar, independent member of Zagreb city assembly and former candidate for Mayor of Zagreb
  - Ankica Lepej, Croatian most notable and first known "whistleblower"
  - List of various public figures and intellectuals, including: Josipa Lisac, Goran Bare, Kemal Monteno, Vesna Teršelič, Marijan Ban, The Beat Fleet, Nikša Bratoš and Damir Urban
  - Emma Bonino
- Vesna Pusić
  - Slavko Goldstein, prominent Croatian-Jewish intellectual and publisher
  - Columnists and journalists: Boris Pavelić (Novi list), Miljenko Jergović (writer and Jutarnji list columnist), Tomislav Klauški (Index.hr journalist)
  - European liberals: Emil Kirjas, Roman Jakič (Zares MEP), Annemie Neyts-Uyttebroeck
  - Be Active, Be Emancipated (B.a.B.e.), Croatian feminist and human rights organization
  - Greens of Croatia
- Dragan Primorac
  - Croatian Party of Rights (HSP), Professors Pavle Rudan, Stipan Janković, Igor Čatić, singer Tereza Kesovija, famous Olympic athletes: Franjo Arapović, Veljko Mršić, Zoran Primorac, Nikolaj Pešalov, foodball player Joško Jeličić, Israeli artist Moti Giladi, former Israeli minister of science Eliezer Sandberg,
- Vesna Škare-Ožbolt
  - Democratic Centre (DC)
- Nadan Vidošević
  - Alliance of Primorje-Gorski Kotar (PGS)
- Miroslav Tuđman
  - Zdravko Tomac
  - Marko Perković Thompson
  - Venio Losert
  - List of academics and colleagues including: Jelena Perčin, Dubravko Jelčić, Slavica Dodig, Ksenija Komadina, Josip Pečarić
  - Hrvoje Hitrec

==== Expense summary ====
By Croatian law all presidential candidates are required to publicly disclose the amount they have raised and spent throughout the official campaign. They submit it through a standardized form to the State Election Committee (Croatian: Državno izborno povjerenstvo, DIP).

The first set of statistics was reported by the candidates before the final week of the campaign. The final amounts were reported to the DIP with the final deadline of January 25, 2010, and have been reported in Narodne novine.

In addition to the input statistics, Croatian NGOs GONG and Transparency International Croatia have decided to hire a media analysis agency which calculated the amount of money that was necessarily spent on advertising on television, radio and print media. They point out that this is only the observable media spending, while they estimate actual cost to be in excess of twice the amount spent on the media.

All numbers apart from votes are in Croatian kunas.

Candidate (Party)	Amount raised: until December 19 (DIP)	Amount spent: until December 20 (GONG)	Amount spent on HRT - total	Total amount spent (DIP)	Votes	Average spent per vote
Andrija Hebrang (HDZ)	4,703,778	1,833,881	619,512	6,379,846	237,998	26.8
Nadan Vidošević (I)	4,422,100	2,800,924	1,607,440	6,823,266	223,892	30.5
Milan Bandić (I)	3,865,551	5,275,338	4,149,785	see second round expense summary		
Dragan Primorac (I)	3,787,000	4,176,064	1,314,518	3,853,407	117,154	32.9
Boris Mikšić (I)	2,928,767	31,053	156,456	3,247,163	41,491	78.3
Ivo Josipović (SDP)	2,866,648	1,792,131	645,345	see second round expense summary		
Vesna Pusić (HNS-LD)	1,914,870	236,921	211,343	1,977,725	143,190	13.8
Miroslav Tuđman (I)	1,084,000	51,077	345,517	1,000,279	80,784	12.4
Vesna Škare Ožbolt (I)	1,035,000	121,485	157,462	1,057,345	37,373	28.3
Damir Kajin (IDS)	479,900	62,937	191,326	590,624	76,411	7.7
Slavko Vukšić (I)	217,000	undisclosed	31,980	refused to submit information	8,309	N/A
Josip Jurčević (I)	133,000	20,144	71,955	171,700	54,177	3.2

=== Second round ===
Immediately after the official results were published shortly after midnight 28 December and it was clear the two candidates to face in a runoff would be Josipović and Bandić all the major candidates gave their speeches. Josipović called for voters to vote for the light, not for the dark, while Bandić insulted Josipović saying he was a pawn of Zoran Milanović and nothing more than his remote-control. The following morning the official campaign for the second round began. Josipović denied being an SDP project calling himself independent and accusing Bandić of being a remote-control of Ivo Sanader, referring among other things to claims by Dragan Primorac that Bandić was the favorite of the former prime minister. Bandić denied the rumors, however the following day the media published a story claiming that Bandić and Sanader had a secret lunch that very day in a Zagreb restaurant. Bandić denied the rumors calling the journalists who published the story liars, saying the media's favorite is Josipović and that they would do anything to discredit him.

On Monday 28 December, the first day of the runoff campaign, the incumbent president Stjepan Mesić indicated that he supports Ivo Josipović to be his successor. He praised his manifesto and said Croatia needs a president working actively against corruption and for justice. He also insulted Milan Bandić saying it was impossible he only spent 3 million kuna for the campaign saying he knows how much a campaign costs. He pleaded for more transparency and called on him to release the names of those who were really financing his campaign. Bandić responded by saying that Mesić hasn't released the names of his donors to this day and that he was a part of both of his campaigns so he knows how nontransparent they were. Mesić called Bandić a liar saying he was the only one in those days to release the name of every single person who contributed to his victory. He said his campaign reports were published, on Croatian, not English, clearly referring to the fact that Bandić couldn't speak proper English. He also suggested there could be one debate held entirely in English, mocking Bandić since he previously claimed he speaks the language. Bandić responded saying he would be glad to attend that debate only if Mesić was moderating it, referring to the fact that the president himself was also not an English speaker. He also called the president an 'old man' saying it was only natural he forgot about the help he provided him during his two campaigns.

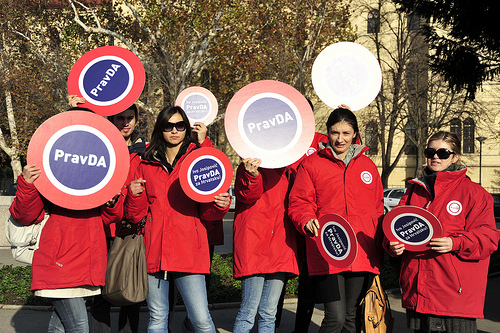
Volunteers for the Josipović campaign

On 29 December Josipović gave a speech on an SDP convention held in Rijeka where he said that with the following presidential election the political map of Croatia would change forever and that by the next parliamentary election Croatia would be colored red, referring to his party's official colour being red. Bandić did not waste time and the next day attacked Josipović arguing that the next president should not be biased once again repeating his claim that Josipović is nothing more than a pawn of Zoran Milanović who would work in his benefit if he should win. The prime minister Jadranka Kosor also criticized Josipović's remarks as unfitting.

The first two second-round debates were held on the same evening, 30 December, the first on HRT starting a couple of minutes after 8 p.m., and the second on Nova TV starting a couple of minutes before 10 p.m. During the debates Josipović emphasized his untarnished political career as well as his knowledge of the law and the Constitution. He defended himself from attacks made by Bandić earlier in the week that he was one of those responsible for writing criminal indictments against Croatia's generals during the war, denouncing the claims as flat-out lies, saying that he offered legal aid to captured Croatian soldiers during the war.

The most direct attack by Bandić on Josipović came at the very end of the first debate when he accused him of damaging the city of Zagreb in 1998 by allegedly abusing his position as the head of the oversight board of a savings bank Zlatica to make a series of financial maneuvers that enabled him to collect his deposit of 138,000 Deutsche Marks from the bank Komercijalna banka that had been blocked and later went bankrupt. Bandić cited a court ruling from 2006 that had invalidated those maneuvers. Josipović defended himself saying that was merely a civil case which he was not even a part of and that he did not commit any illegal actions. Josipović also had to defend his damaging quotation that Croatia would be coloured red by the next election, saying that it was only natural for a political party to be ambitious saying he does not consider the remarks to be unfitting repeating once again that, if elected, he would be the president of all citizens.

The issue of whom Ivo Sanader supports unexpectedly escalated when Sanader announced he was returning to active politics at a Sunday, January 3 press conference, which resulted in a blitz uproar among the coalition partners, and subsequently his ejection from the HDZ party. President Mesić attacked Bandić saying the former prime minister returned to support him, trying to once again link Bandić to the most unpopular politician in the country. Bandić denied such claims calling them lies and distractions and once again accused Josipović of being a pawn of Zoran Milanović. At the same time, Bandić's ally Željko Kerum publicly stated that Ivo Sanader would be an "ideal president", but afterwards he backtracked somewhat, while repeating his well-known attitude on how the media is biased against him and Bandić.

Milan Bandić heavily used religion as an issue in the campaign, calculating that Josipović's agnosticism would be a turn-off for a largely Catholic country as Croatia. He constantly repeated the only one he fears is God and that he was raised as a true believer and a humble Christian, also making claims that he has the support of the Catholic Church. Josipović largely ignored Bandić's attempts saying he would be the president of all Croatians no matter their religious beliefs. The incumbent president Stjepan Mesić was elected twice despite his atheism. However, the Bandić campaign used all tactics to force the issue, even distributing fliers in front of churches after the Sunday mass across the country urging believers to choose between the cross and a red star, referencing communism.

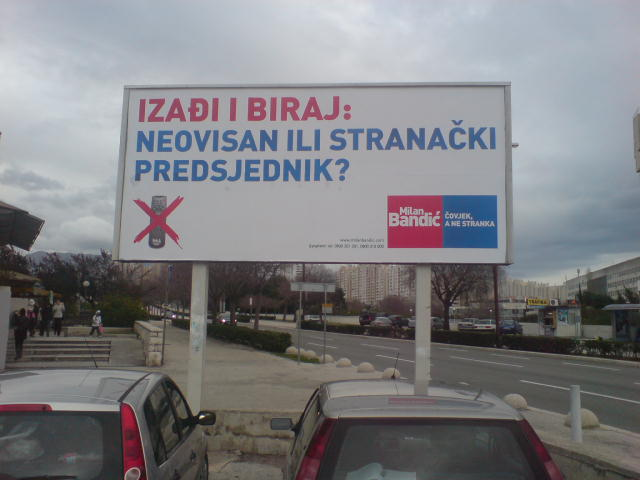
One of the posters of the Bandić campaign. The message roughly translates: 'Choose: A party or an independent president?' A picture of a remote-control is shown in the lower-left corner referencing Bandić's accusation that Josipović is a pawn on a remote-control of his party

Eventually, Josipović responded to the other side's discrediting tactics based on religion as well as the savings fund affair by raising the issue of how Bandić had divorced his wife in 1996 and because of that managed to buy out another apartment from the government with a discount, claiming Bandić violated the most sacred sacrament of marriage with the intent of making profit. Bandić responded in outrage saying he went through great emotional pain during his divorce saying Josipović was not a man unless he apologized.

On 3 January the third debate took place, hosted by RTL Televizija. The main topics were the return of former prime minister Ivo Sanader to the political scene, the economy, taxes and foreign relations, especially with Slovenia. Bandić once again repeated he was a man of work who would do anything for the people, while Josipović demonstrated his knowledge of law and foreign policy. On the next day, the results of a second set of election polls were published, showing Bandić made some gains, but Josipović's support was mostly unchanged.

The Josipović campaign released a list of 20 Croatian generals who allegedly supported him in the second round. This endorsement was subsequently used in campaign advertisements by Josipović. One of these generals, Nojko Marinović, denied any participation in the endorsement, calling it a "coarse manipulation". Petar Janjić-Tromblon was also listed and he released a statement denying his support, saying he "doesn't want to be part of their games". The name of Tihomir Blaškić was also floated in the media in this context. Josipović was confronted about it during the third debate, and he claimed that the disavowals were made because of peer pressure. The Bandić campaign also released their own list of associations of Croatian defenders who allegedly supported him in the second round, including the Association of the 105th Brigade of the Croatian National Guard, but the war-time commander of the 105th Brigade of the Croatian Army Stjepan Ivanić came forward to state that their association was both named and listed wrongly and said that their members were "appalled by the disinformation".

The Bandić campaign created a negative campaign television ad that used a recording of Josipović's words, but after the Josipović campaign complained, the State Election Committee banned it as a violation of campaign rules, while Bandić campaign complained of censorship. They eventually released a modified version of the same ad, just avoiding the use of Josipović's own voice.

The January 7 debate on Nova TV was held at 21:45, moderated once again by Mislav Bago. The two candidates had a somewhat more intense exchange regarding most issues previously discussed in the campaign. They once again compared tenure in the League of Communists of Croatia and SDP, their personal properties as well as moral values. Josipović called on Bandić to compare their physical and stock properties in court, which the latter refused. There was some talk of endorsements, and some reflections on talking points. They finished in a more cordial tone with the mention of future private visits as well as family pets.

The last debate occurred on January 8 on HRT, moderated by Branimir Bilić. Most common topics were covered once again, ending with some larger themes of international politics such as global warming and the inequality of the third world.

==== Endorsements ====
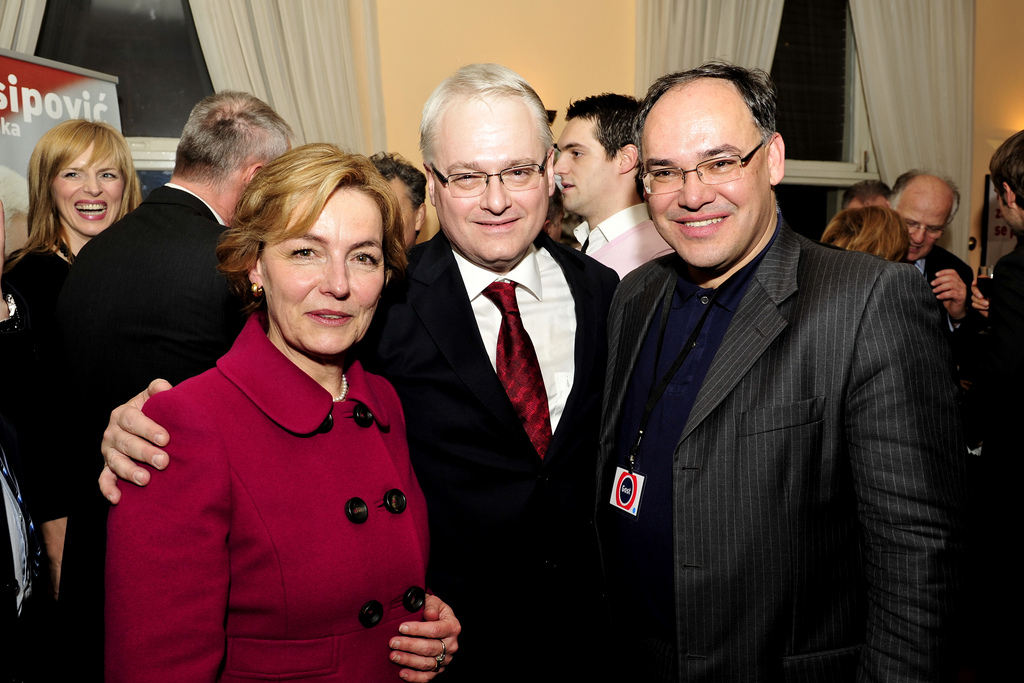
First round presidential candidates Vesna Pusić (left) and Damir Kajin (right) endorsed Ivo Josipović (centre) in the second round

- Ivo Josipović (SDP):
  - President Stipe Mesić
  - Nadan Vidošević, first round candidate
  - Vesna Pusić, first round candidate, and the Croatian People's Party - Liberal Democrats
  - Damir Kajin, first round candidate, and the Istrian Democratic Assembly
  - Croatian Social Liberal Party
  - Croatian Party of Pensioners
  - Independent Democratic Serb Party
  - Party of European Socialists
  - Political parties not represented in Parliament: Alliance of Primorje-Gorski Kotar, Green List of Croatia, Socialist Labour Party of Croatia, Women's Democratic Party, Democratic Party of Zagorje, Democratic Party of Pensioners, Economic Party, Left of Croatia, Croatian Green Party – Ecological Alliance, Democratic Party of Međimurje, Adriatic Social Democratic Party of Croatia, Banija Democratic Party, Autonomous Regional Party of Croatian Primorje, Gorski Kotar, Islands and the City of Rijeka, Autochthonous Croatian Peasant Party, Serb People's Party, Democratic Party of Serbs, New Serb Party and Community of Serbs in Croatia
  - Plinio Cuccurin, leader of NGO Ladonja, association for better Istria,
  - Ivan Grubišić, Catholic priest, sociologist and leader of Citizen's Ethical Forum
  - Homeland war former generals: Rahim Ademi, Tihomir Blaškić, Ivica Obrovac, Veselko Gabričević and Josip Zvirotić, including notable warriors Branko Borković alias Mladi Jastreb, Predrag Fred Matić.
  - Damir Novotny, economist, Mirko Filipović
- Milan Bandić (independent, supported by HDSSB):
  - Boris Mikšić, first round candidate
  - Miroslav Tuđman, first round candidate
  - Željko Kerum, mayor of Split
  - Ljubo Bešlić, mayor of Mostar
  - Political parties not represented in Parliament: Croatian Party of Rights – Ante Starčević, Green party and the Party of Pensioners
  - A list of various of war veteran associations, including the Zagreb and other city or regional branches of the Alliance of Homeland War Associations and the Croatian Homeland War Invalids (HVIDRA) and Croatian Association of Prisoners in Serbian Concentration Camps and the Association of Croatian Volunteers of the Homeland War (UHDDR) led by Tomislav Merčep
  - Political parties from Bosnia and Herzegovina: Croatian Democratic Union of Bosnia and Herzegovina, Croatian Democratic Union 1990, Croatian Christian Democratic Union (Bosnia and Herzegovina)
  - Croatian Society of Victimology
  - Marko Perković Thompson, Zvonko Bušić, Zlatko Sudac

==== Notable abstentions ====
The Croatian Democratic Union (HDZ) stated that they will not endorse any candidate in the second round, and have censored local branches that attempted to explicitly endorse Bandić. This happened to HDZ's mayor of Zadar Zvonimir Vrančić who first endorsed him but later disclaimed official support, and also to the HDZ branch of Makarska which also retracted their support under threat of sanction.

The Catholic Church in Croatia claimed that they're neutral in this; the Croatian Bishops' Conference states that they never endorse anyone. But, there are some signs of subtle pro-Bandić attitude: Croatian archbishop Josip Bozanić was visited by Milan Bandić in the Archbishop's office on January 2. The editor of the official church gazette Glas Koncila Ivan Miklenić, otherwise known as a vocal critic of President Mesić, did not endorse any candidate and instead expressed disappointment with both candidates, but later made statements that were interpreted to favor Bandić. During the campaign, numerous minor violations related to Church members were observed by GONG, in favor of Bandić.

Many first-round candidates endorsed the second-round candidates, but some made public statements regarding the second round but did not endorse. Dragan Primorac made several public statements - he initially tried to stay completely neutral, but later released one where he listed some characteristics of the future president that he would want, without naming a candidate, but focusing on the fight against corruption. The reception was mixed – Večernji list said he chose no one, while Jutarnji list said that he chose Josipović, reading between the lines. The Josipović campaign later decided to include Primorac in their endorsement list and Primorac did not seem to come forward with a public rebuttal. On the other hand, Josip Jurčević made a late public statement telling voters to void their ballot.

==== Expense summary including the second round ====
These following amounts were submitted to the DIP before the final week of the campaign. The rest will be delivered and published after the second round. The amount spent calculation was done by GONG and TIH for the same period.

All numbers apart from votes are in Croatian kunas.

Candidate (Party)	Amount raised: until January 3 (DIP)	Amount spent: until January 3 (GONG)	Total amount spent (DIP)	Votes	Average spent per vote
Milan Bandić (I)	6,986,061	9,589,142.60	15,278,984	883,222	17.3
Ivo Josipović (SDP)	4,753,082	3,937,365.20	8,950,325	1,339,385	6.7

== Opinion polls ==
=== Exit polls second round ===
Candidate	Party	Ipsos PULS for RTL and Nova
Ivo Josipović	SDP	64.6%
Milan Bandić	Independent	35.4%
Source: izbori.dnevnik.hr

=== Before the second round of vote ===
Candidate	28 Dec 2009 Puls for Nova TV	29 Dec 2009 Totus Opiniometar	30 Dec 2009 Cro Demoskop	2–4 Jan 2010 Media Metar	4 Jan 2010 Promocija Plus	4–5 Jan 2010 Puls for RTL Televizija and Večernji list	7 Jan 2010 Totus Opiniometar	7 Jan 2010 Mediana
Ivo Josipović (SDP)	56.3%	52.5%	53.5%	55.2%	54.5%	55.8%	52.6%	52.3%
Milan Bandić (I)	31.6%	14.7%	33.7%	44.8%	37.1%	39.5%	23.8%	35.6%
Remainder	12.1%	32.8%	12.9%	/	8.4%	4.4%	23.6%	12%
Lead	24.7%	37.8%	19.8%	10.4%	17.4%	16.3%	28.8%	16.7%

=== Exit polls first round ===
Candidate	Party	Ipsos PULS for RTL and Nova
Ivo Josipović	SDP	32.7%
Milan Bandić	Independent	14.1%
Andrija Hebrang	HDZ	12.1%
Nadan Vidošević	Independent	11.7%
Vesna Pusić	HNS-LD	7.6%
Dragan Primorac	Independent	5.8%
Damir Kajin	IDS	4.1%
Miroslav Tuđman	Independent	3.5%
Josip Jurčević	Independent	2.6%
Boris Mikšić	Independent	2%
Vesna Škare Ožbolt	Independent	1.6%
Slavko Vukšić	DSSR	0.6%
Source: izbori.dnevnik.hr

=== Before the first round of vote ===
Date(s) Conducted	Polling Organisation/Client	Ivo Josipović	Milan Bandić	Nadan Vidošević	Andrija Hebrang	Vesna Pusić	Dragan Primorac	Vesna Škare Ožbolt	Damir Kajin	Josip Jurčević	Miroslav Tuđman	Boris Mikšić	Slavko Vukšić	Undecided / none
23 Dec	International Institute Ifimes	24.1%	9.8%	13.3%	7.1%	6.9%	6.6%	0.2%	1.1%	0.5%	1.5%	0.4%	0.1%	28.4%
23 Dec	Puls for Večernji list and RTL Televizija	31.9%	16.8%	13.1%	8.1%	6.1%	7.9%	2.7%	3.1%	1.0%	2.7%	1.0%	0.6%	5%
22 Dec	Mediana Fides for Jutarnji list	24.8%	11.9%	9.4%	6.4%	7.8%	6.7%	NA	NA	NA	NA	NA	NA	NA
22 Dec	Puls for Nova TV	31%	17.4%	11.9%	9.3%	6.4%	7.9%	2.5%	3%	1.6%	2%	1%	0.6%	5.5%
22 Dec	Totus Opiniometar	19%	9.5%	14.2%	7%	4.6%	3%	0.2%	1.4%	0.6%	1.5%	0.4%	0.2%	26.7% / 11.4%
17 Dec	Puls for T-portal	29.3%	12.2%	13.9%	7.6%	7.2%	10.4%	1.2%	2.7%	2.3%	2.3%	2%	1%	9.8%
17 Dec	Totus Opiniometar	19.2%	6.3%	13.5%	6.8%	5.5%	3.3%	1.2%	2.2%	0.7%	0.7%	0.4%	0.2%	40%
14 Dec	Puls for SDP	29.6%	11.8%	14.3%	7.1%	8.2%	10.6%	2.1%	2.3%	2.1%	2.4%	0.4%	0.2%	10%
9 Dec	Puls for SDP	30.4%	13%	12%	8.7%	5.1%	9.8%	2%	4.1%	2.4%	2%	0.2%	0.1%	10%
9 Dec	Promocija Plus for HDZ	30%	13%	12%	11%	N/A	8%	N/A	N/A	N/A	N/A	N/A	N/A	N/A
3 Dec	CRO Demoskop (Promocija plus)	26.2%	16.2%	15.3%	7.8%	7%	8.6%	1.7%	3.4%	1%	1.8%	0.4%	0.2%	10.4%
30 Nov	Puls for Nova TV	25.3%	16.6%	16%	7.9%	5.8%	5.1%	<5%	<5%	<5%	<5%	<5%	<5%	9.5%
28 Nov	Puls for Večernji list and RTL Televizija	29.2%	15.6%	13.2%	7.7%	4.8%	8.5%	2.6%	3.2%	1.5%	3.4%	0.4%	0.5%	9.4%
25 Nov	Totus Opiniometar	16.1%	7.2%	13.8%	3.1%	2.5%	4.7%	0.6%	1.6%	1%	0.6%	N/A	N/A	33%
Start of the official campaign
19 Nov	Mediana Fides for Jutarnji list	27.6%	15.4%	12.7%	8.4%	6.0%	8.1%	N/A	2.2%	N/A	1.2%	1.1%	N/A	N/A
17 Nov	Puls for T-Portal	28.1%	15.8%	14.4%	12.2%	7.2%	5.2%	1.1%	1.8%	1.3%	0.8%	0.3%	N/A	11.4%
17 Nov	Puls for Nova TV	26.4%	15.7%	14.9%	11.6%	8.6%	6.8%	N/A	N/A	N/A	N/A	N/A	N/A	14.5%
4 Nov	CRO Demoskop (Promocija plus)	24.9%	14.5%	13.4%	9.4%	8.6%	<4%	<4%	<4%	N/A	N/A	N/A	N/A	13.3%
4 Nov	Totus Opiniometar	17.2%	9.7%	14.6%	5%	5.1%	2.2%	0.6%	1.6%	0.7%	1.1%	N/A	N/A	43.6%
31 Oct	GfK for Jutarnji list	17.1%	15.2%	11.9%	9%	4.4%	3.9%	1.5%	3.5%	N/A	0.6%	0.6%	N/A	45%
31 Oct	Puls for Nova TV	24.6%	17.6%	13.1%	11%	6.8%	N/A	N/A	N/A	N/A	N/A	N/A	N/A	9.1%
28 Oct	Puls for T-Portal	28.5%	13.6%	12.7%	10.7%	7.2%	4.2%	4.6%	4.3%	2.3%	1.6%	N/A	N/A	10.5%
18 Oct	Puls for Večernji list	26.6%	11.3%	10.8%	8%	9.2%	4.4%	5.9%	5%	1.3%	0.8%	1%	N/A	10.5%
18 Sep	Mediana for Jutarnji list	21.1%	14.7%	15%	8.3%	11%	3.3%	N/A	4.5%	N/A	N/A	N/A	N/A	N/A
11 Sep	Sinergie for SDP	26.4%	6.7%	13%	7.1%	4.4%	N/A	4.2%	3.3%	N/A	N/A	N/A	N/A	N/A
26 Aug	Promocija plus for SDP	25%	10.5%	10.5%	12%	9.5%	N/A	N/A	N/A	N/A	N/A	N/A	N/A	32.5%
24 Aug	Hendal for Tportal	25.8%	10%	9.3%	4%	7.5%	1.3%	N/A	3.3%	1.8%	2.3%	2.3%	N/A	31.3%
3 Aug	CRO Demoskop (Promocija plus)	22.1%	N/A	14.1%	11.1%	11.8%	N/A	N/A	4.8%	6.3%	2%	N/A	N/A	15.8%
1 Aug	Puls for Nova TV	32.9%	N/A	12.8%	17.3%	9.7%	N/A	N/A	6.9%	N/A	N/A	N/A	N/A	N/A

==== Hypothetical second round match-ups ====
Candidate	Party	17 Nov 2009 Puls for Nova TV	19 Nov 2009 Mediana Fides for Jutarnji list	28 Nov 2009 Puls for RTL Televizija and Večernji list	22 Dec 2009 Puls for Nova TV	23 Dec 2009 Puls for RTL Televizija and Večernji list
Ivo Josipović	SDP	54%	47.4%	55%	53%	58.2%
Milan Bandić	Independent	42%	36.1%	35%	36%	32.2%
remainder		4%	16.5%	10%	11%	9.6%

Candidate	Party	17 Nov 2009 Puls for Nova TV	19 Nov 2009 Mediana Fides for Jutarnji list	28 Nov 2009 Puls for RTL Televizija and Večernji list	22 Dec 2009 Puls for Nova TV	23 Dec 2009 Puls for RTL Televizija and Večernji list
Ivo Josipović	SDP	51%	45.7%	51%	53%	53.4%
Nadan Vidošević	Independent	41%	34.2%	35%	36%	34.8%

Candidate	Party	17 Nov 2009 Puls for Nova TV	28 Nov 2009 Puls for RTL Televizija and Večernji list	22 Dec 2009 Puls for Nova TV	23 Dec 2009 Puls for RTL Televizija and Večernji list
Ivo Josipović	SDP	63%	67%	64%	65.9%
Andrija Hebrang	HDZ	30%	22%	25%	26.6%

Candidate	Party	17 Nov 2009 Puls for Nova TV	19 Nov 2009 Mediana Fides for Jutarnji list	28 Nov 2009 Puls for RTL Televizija and Večernji list
Nadan Vidošević	Independent	52%	42.8%	47%
Milan Bandić	Independent	39%	21%	38%

Candidate	Party	23 Dec 2009 Puls for RTL Televizija and Večernji list
Ivo Josipović	SDP	59.7%
Dragan Primorac	Independent	30.2%

== Results ==
Candidate	Party	First round		Second round	
Candidate	Party	Votes	%	Votes	%
Ivo Josipović	Social Democratic Party of Croatia	640,594	32.78	1,339,385	60.26
Milan Bandić	Independent	293,068	14.99	883,222	39.74
Andrija Hebrang	Croatian Democratic Union	237,998	12.18		
Nadan Vidošević	Independent	223,892	11.46		
Vesna Pusić	Croatian People's Party – Liberal Democrats	143,190	7.33		
Dragan Primorac	Independent	117,154	5.99		
Miroslav Tuđman	Independent	80,784	4.13		
Damir Kajin	Istrian Democratic Assembly	76,411	3.91		
Josip Jurčević	Independent	54,177	2.77		
Boris Mikšić	Independent	41,491	2.12		
Vesna Škare-Ožbolt	Independent	37,373	1.91		
Slavko Vukšić	Democratic Party of Slavonia Plain	8,309	0.43		
Total		1,954,441	100.00	2,222,607	100.00
Valid votes		1,954,441	98.94	2,222,607	98.64
Invalid/blank votes		20,890	1.06	30,547	1.36
Total votes		1,975,331	100.00	2,253,154	100.00
Registered voters/turnout		4,495,233	43.94	4,495,528	50.12
Source: State Election Committee

=== First round result analysis ===
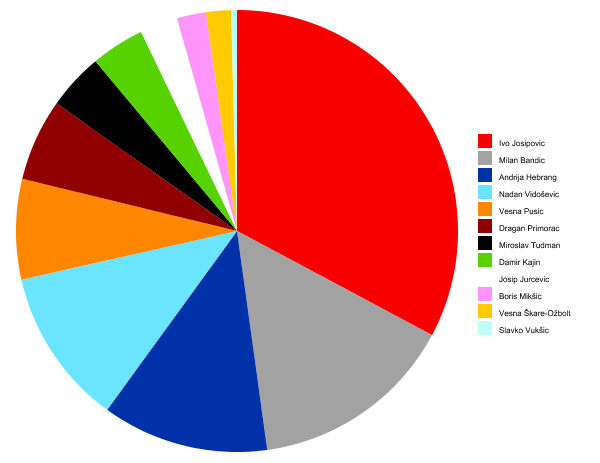
Results of the first round

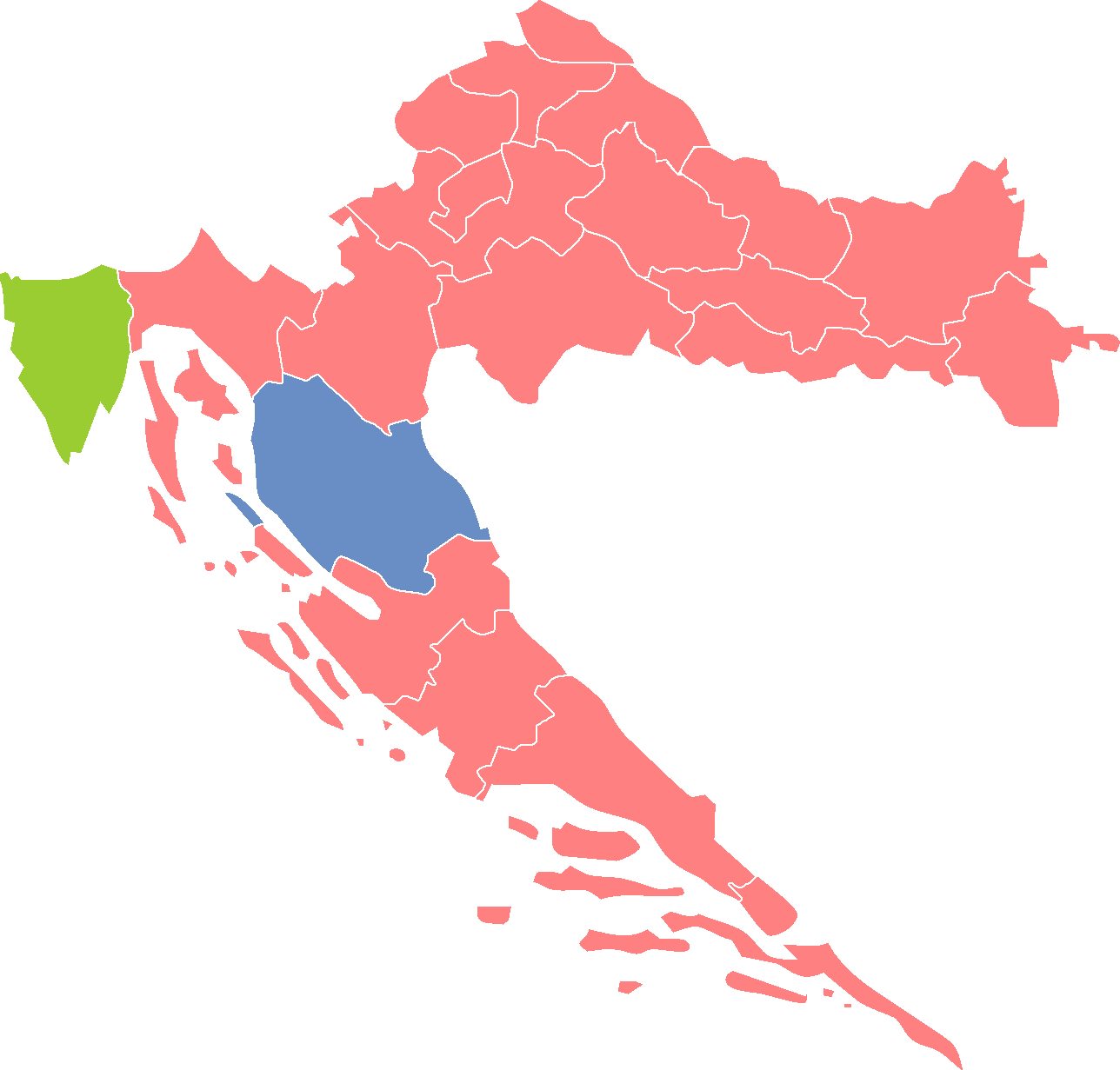
Results of the first round in all of Croatia's counties: the candidate with the plurality of votes in each administrative division. Josipović Hebrang Kajin

The first round of the election saw the lowest turnout of any presidential election in Croatia's history with only 43.96% of all the citizens eligible to vote participating in the election compared to 50.57% five years ago and 62.98% ten years ago. Most political observers noted the public's increasing distrust in politicians and the political system as the main reason for the low turnout.

Nationwide, Ivo Josipović obtained 32% and Milan Bandić 14%, meaning the two of them combined achieved less support than Stjepan Mesić did in 2005 in the first round only. The fact that there were only three actual left-leaning candidates meant the left was relatively united under Josipović, while the votes of the right were spread out on several prominent candidates, including Bandić, which was one of the reasons why no right wing candidate managed to qualify for a run-off. As such, this election became historic as a run-off would feature two candidates once in the same party, Josipović, who rejoined SDP a year before the election, and Bandić, who left SDP a month before the election so he could run as an independent.

The candidate of the governing centre-right Croatian Democratic Union (HDZ) Andrija Hebrang came in third with 12% of the vote, a result noticeably better than most polls had predicted, but still seen by many as a debacle for HDZ as he achieved the lowest ever result for the party on a national level and also became their first presidential candidate not to secure a second round since Mate Granić in 2000. Nadan Vidošević, who was seen by many as a front-runner for the presidency in the beginning of the year, came in fourth with 11% of the vote. Dragan Primorac was the third prominent right-wing candidate who invested huge sums in his campaign, but in the poll he achieved only 6%, lower than what many polls had predicted. Primorac was indeed surpassed even by the centre-left candidate Vesna Pusić who was fifth, obtaining 7.25%.

No other candidate achieved more than 5% on a national level. Left-wing Damir Kajin made a decent showing in his home county, but was nevertheless surpassed by the right-wing Miroslav Tuđman in the overall tally. Slavko Vukšić's final number of votes was even smaller than the number of signatures that originally supported his nomination.

Josipović carried all 21 counties except for two, the Lika–Senj County which was carried by Andrija Hebrang and the Istria County carried by Damir Kajin. He also won the all major cities including the capital of Croatia, Zagreb, a sort of embarrassment for Bandić who is the mayor of the city. Bandić had won the 2009 Zagreb local elections with almost 150,000 votes just seven months prior, but with a turnout of 41.69%/33.62% and under the SDP banner. This time he won only some 59,000 votes or 15.64% in Zagreb, with a local turnout of 52.40%.

=== First round election night ===
As all the polls around the country closed at 7 p.m., the first exit polls were published by the major television networks. They showed Ivo Josipović easily claiming first place, but failing to obtain an outright majority winning 32%. The polls showed Milan Bandić, Andrija Hebrang and Nadan Vidošević in a statistical tie with each of them achieving 14%, 12% and 11% respectively. Andrija Hebrang's third place was seen as a great success as most opinion polls before the first round showed him with only single-digit approval, while Nadan Vidošević's placing was seen as a disappointment since most polls before the vote showed him battling for second place with Milan Bandić. The polls predicted Vesna Pusić and Dragan Primorac would be the only other candidates to pass 5% with each of them collecting 7% and 5% respectively. In 2007, during the parliamentary election, all exit polls predicted SDP would narrowly win, when in the reality HDZ turned out as the victor. With that in mind, Andrija Hebrang expressed conviction that when actual results were published, he would overtake Bandić and qualify for second round. He claimed that exit polls do not take into account the votes coming from the citizens living abroad and that conservative voters do not participate in exit polls as much as liberal voters. However, the exit polls predicted the outcome almost perfectly as the country's electoral commission's results later confirmed.

Ivo Josipović gave a short speech after the exit polls were announced saying he was confident the official results would match the results they predicted. After the official results were published, he gave a victory speech shortly after midnight thanking his colleagues and especially his voters for their support and expressed conviction he would be the victor once again two weeks later. He said the citizens of Croatia have a choice between the light and the dark, with him being the light, referring to his untarnished political record, and Bandić being the dark, referring to his allegations of corruption. Milan Bandić arrived to his campaign headquarters just a couple of minutes before midnight and just a couple of minutes after the results were announced he gave his speech. He congratulated all the other candidates and said a new race began that night. He said he would be an independent president, not a remote-control of Zoran Milanović and accused Josipović of being a project of the highest-ranking members of SDP. He claimed Croatia needs a president that works for them, not for his party. While he was speaking, most television networks were showing scenes from Josipović headquarters in the corner, with Milanović observing Bandić's remarks. During the middle of his speech, right when Bandić was bashing his former party and its leader, Josipović came to the stage and all television stations switched to hear what he had to say.

Andrija Hebrang accused his party's dissidents, Vidošević and Primorac, as well as most right-wing candidates for 'stealing' his votes saying the result was that two left-wingers would face-off in the second round. Despite this, he called the election a great victory of the right claiming that right-leaning candidates combined achieved better results that left-leaning candidates combined. In making this assertion, he failed to consider Bandić as left-leaning, and ignored Vidošević's appeal to the left-leaning voters as well. Vidošević conceded defeat saying that one should never blame his failures on others, but himself. He urged the public to continue believing in a better tomorrow saying that Croatia should be a country of knowledge and justice, not of corruption and divisiveness. Pusić gave a short teary speech calling Croatia a country with a lot of potential with only the right leadership. She also noted that no government would ever be able to win without the support of HNS. Primorac said he would be forming a new party which would be independent from both HDZ and SDP and said he saw a bright future for Croatia.

This election night also saw great drama with the war of the television networks. Nova TV and RTL Televizija organized the exit polls together and offered HRT to participate, however HRT refused claiming they were unaware exit polls would be permitted as electoral silence lasted until midnight. HRT showed the results of the exit polls during their prime-time news show Dnevnik. Nova TV and RTL Televizija objected and demanded HRT to pay for distributing their polls.

=== Second round result analysis ===
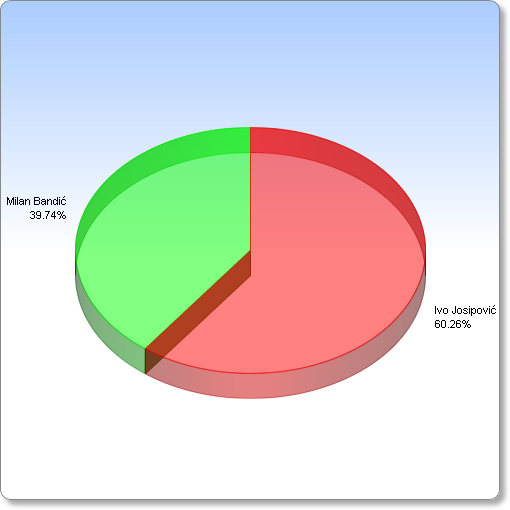
Results of the second round

The first round of the election saw the lowest turnout for any Croatian presidential election ever, so many political pundits at the beginning of the runoff campaign predicted an even lower turnout for the second round. However, as the campaign started to become more heated and the electoral body more divided, it was evident the runoff election would have a greater turnout than the first round. The increase in turnout was 277,661 people, of which 268,166 cast valid votes. Overall, 50.13% of citizens who are eligible to vote fulfilled their public right. That's a little more than 6 percentage points higher turnout than the first round and on pair with five years ago, but 10 percentage points less than 10 years ago and the lowest turnout for a runoff presidential election ever.

Nationwide, Ivo Josipović achieved 1,339,385 votes, or 60.26%, while Milan Bandić won 883,222 votes, or 39.74%. Most polls before the election were showing Josipović with a hefty double-digit lead, but never as much as 20 percentage points as he achieved during the election. The difference between the two candidates came as a surprise to many pundits and analysts for two reasons: the polls usually favor the more liberal candidate since left-leaning voters tend to participate in opinion polls more than conservative voters; and the fact that most polls before the election didn't include the votes from the citizens living abroad, which was expected to be a strong boost for Bandić come Election Day. Nevertheless, the final result is similar to the result of the last several polls when only the certain voters were taken into account, which may indicate that few undecided voters actually went to the polls in the second round.

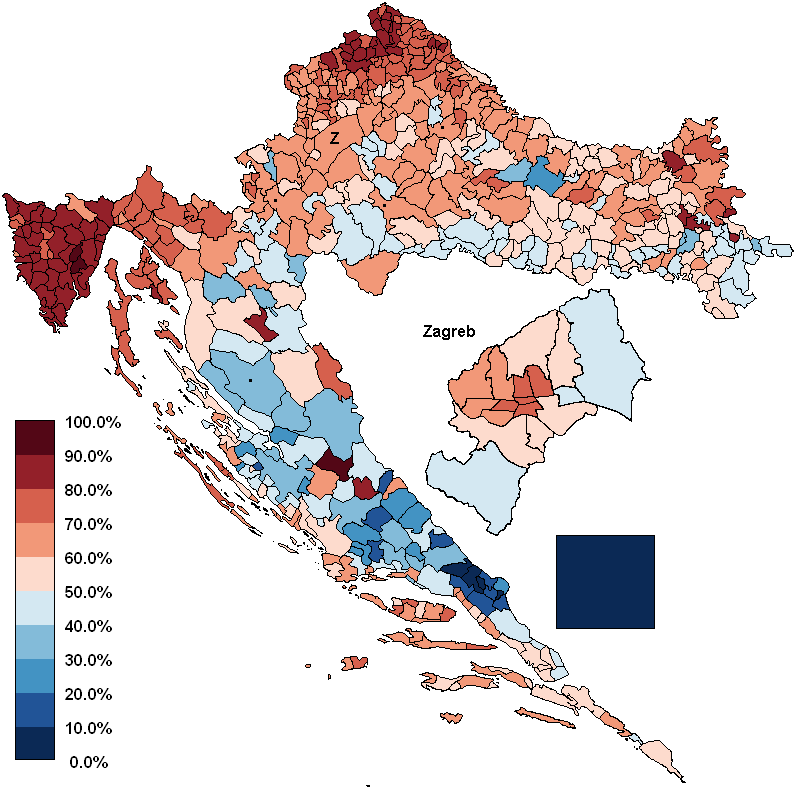
Votes for Josipović in the 2nd round The bottom right square represents extraterritorial voters Zagreb (Z) boroughs are also shown separately

Josipović won all Croatian counties except for the Lika-Senj county, the least populated Croatian county. Similarly, he won all cities with more than 20,000 inhabitants and all cities that are county seats, except for Gospić, which is also the smallest. The capital city Zagreb was also won by Josipović, with a margin that was slightly higher than the national average. Bandić was unsuccessful in the majority of Zagreb boroughs, but he did win Lika and the extraterritorial electoral unit, where the majority of votes came from Bosnia and Herzegovina. The closest margins were in the traditional right-wing strongholds in parts of Slavonia and Dalmatia.

According to the exit polls Josipović won more than 90% of Vesna Pusić's voters and 70% of Nadan Vidošević's voters. He also managed to consolidate the traditionally centre-left voters winning 90% of his party's as well as more than 80% of HNS voters and more than 70% of the centrist HSLS and centre-right HSS voters, at the same time appealing to every fourth HDZ voter. Bandić won almost 80% of all Hebrang voters as well as 57% of Primorac's voters and obtained 3 quarters of all HDZ voters, confirming the assumption that Bandić mostly appealed to the right.

The result was not received particularly well by the Church gazette Glas Koncila editor Ivan Miklenić, who stated Josipović's legitimacy, but first pointed out that he was elected by less than a third of the total population, and claimed that he was supported by "obscure power centers". He concluded that the election is the result of a policy of continuation and "not a democratic breakthrough". The secular Jutarnji list editor Davor Butković lambasted that opinion, saying he was personally a Catholic but was offended by the notion that the Church would undermine the election result. Having a third of the electorate's votes is not relevant because not even the late Franjo Tuđman or even any single Government was ever elected with more than a half of the electorate. He concluded by asking why the Church is "insulting its faithful who voted for Josipović" and saying that as long as this kind of a stance persists, the Croatian churches will "remain empty other than on major holidays". The secular Večernji list chief commentator Milan Ivkošić once again called on Josipović to stay away from former President Mesić's "selective finger-pointing" which in his opinion particularly impacted the President's relations with Kaptol, in addition to a perceived "complaisance in the defence of Croatian national interests". He also noted that the new president remains "marked" by his agnosticism in relation to the right-wing voting body, but called on the Croatians to determine a basic consensus and avoid any accusations of "treason". Josipović indeed explicitly stated that he "will not step into that whole polemic" and that he has no comment.

=== Second round election night ===
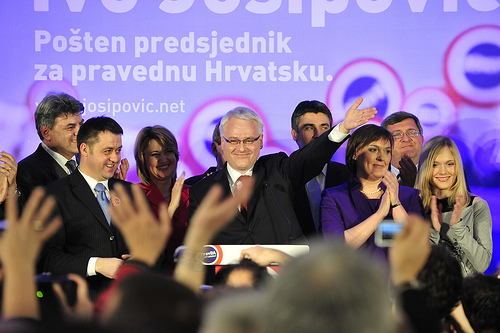
Ivo Josipović prepares to give a victory speech after it was announced he would be the next president

When the polls around the country closed at 19:00 RTL and Nova TV published the results of the exit polls conducted by Ipsos PULS. They predicted a landslide win for Josipović, giving him an advantage of almost 30 percentage points, significantly larger than all of the second-round polls. This shifted much of the political commentary and rendered much of the expected drama moot. The Josipović headquarters started celebrating immediately after the polls closed claiming that the difference is too large for Bandić to overcome and the exit polls don't feature such a large statistical margin of error. The Bandić campaign said they'll wait for official results, but admitted it would be very hard for Bandić to overtake Josipović's 30 point lead even when the votes from abroad were tallied. The exit polls predicted the outcome well as the ratio between the two candidates was 9 to 1 for Bandić abroad, where there were no exit polls, which narrowed Josipović's victory to a final difference of 21 percentage points.

After the official results were announced at midnight it was evident that Ivo Josipović was elected the third president of the Republic. He gave a victory speech shortly after thanking everybody who voted for him, but also saying he would be the president of all, not just the left. He called his victory a step in the right direction and said he would work hard for justice and a better Croatia. Josipović did not finish his acceptance speech before Bandić started his concession speech, using the opportunity to decry "hate, contempt and intolerance from everyone" towards him. The Bandić self-victimization was ultimately not well received by both the voters and the media.

During election night, Milanović gave an interview to the three major television networks where he congratulated Ivo Josipović and called on Jadranka Kosor to hold a meeting with him where they would discuss the major political differences between their two parties and find a way to agree on how to help the economy further. The prime minister responded the very same night when she congratulated Josipović saying she invited the opposition leader for a coffee over six months ago claiming he refused. Milanović responded the next day by saying he doesn't want finger-pointing, but a constructive discussion about jobs, the budget and tax reform. They came to an agreement the following week and they held a meeting on 21 January.

Although HRT admitted they crossed the line two weeks ago when they reported the results of the exit polls conducted by RTL and Nova TV, they once again 'borrowed' the results for the second round election night. This caused a stir within HRT against the main editor of the news program Hloverka Novak-Srzić who was faced with scandals long before the election night incident. Finally, exactly nine days after the election, on 19 January, she was released of her duties as chief editor.
