= Vukšić =

Vukšić may refer to:

== People with the surname ==
- Branko Vukšić (born 1956), Croatian journalist and politician
- Mladen Vukšić (born 1965), Bosnian-born Montenegrin Roman Catholic bishop
- Slavko Vukšić (born 1949), Croatian politician and businessman
- Tomo Vukšić (born 1954), Bosnian Roman Catholic archbishop

== Places ==
- Vukšić, Croatia, a village near Benkovac
- Vukšić Donji, village in Bosnia and Herzegovina
- Vukšić Gornji, village in Bosnia and Herzegovina

== See also ==
- Vukšići
