= Mikšić =

Mikšić or Miksic is a Croatian surname. Notable people with the surname include:

- Boris Mikšić (born 1948), Croatian businessman and politician
- John N. Miksic (1946–2025), American archaeologist
