= Jadranka Kosor =

Prime Minister of Croatia from 2009 to 2011

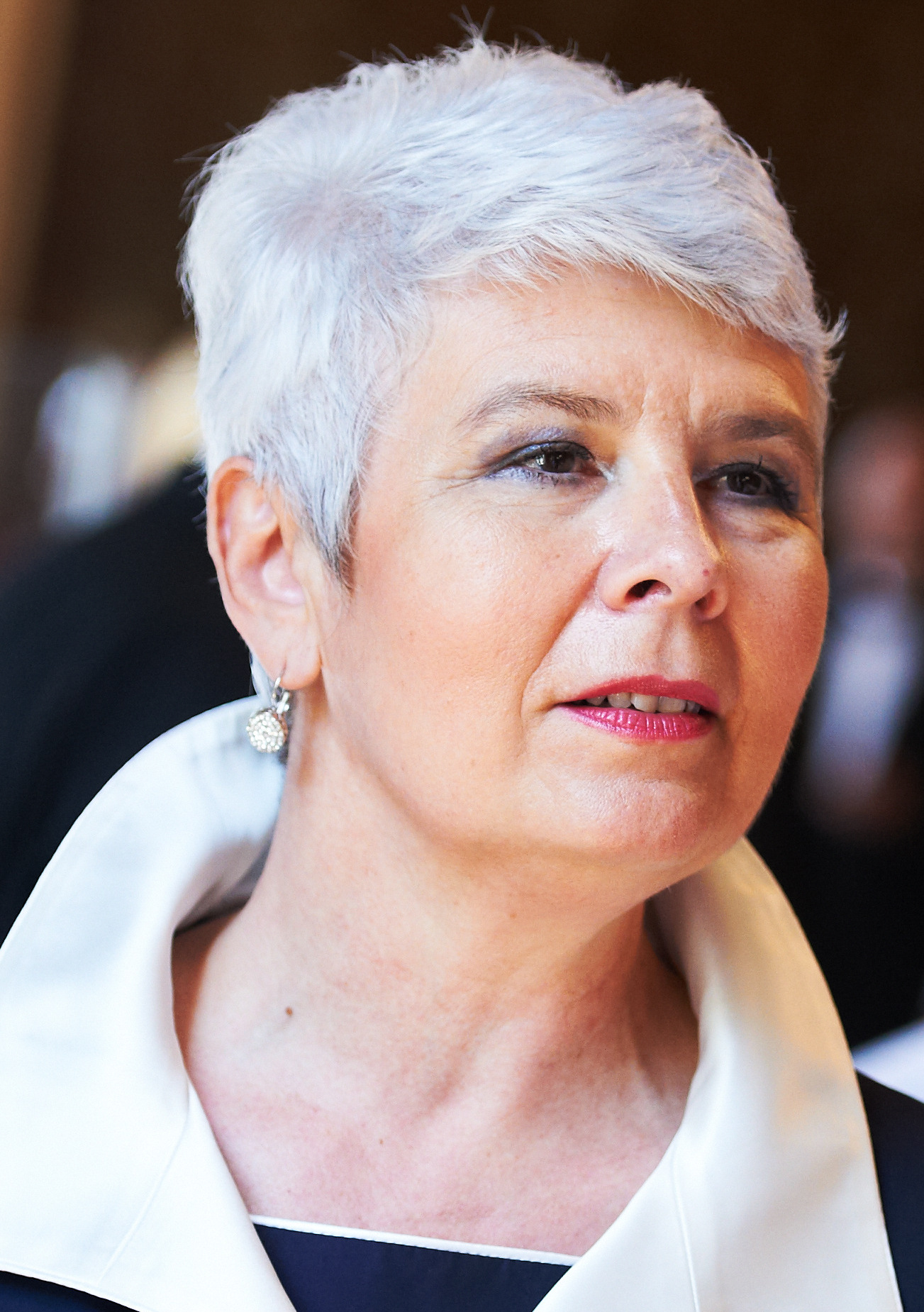
- Kosor in 2011

Prime Minister of Croatia
- In office 6 July 2009 – 23 December 2011
- President: Stjepan Mesić; Ivo Josipović
- Preceded by: Ivo Sanader
- Succeeded by: Zoran Milanović

Deputy Prime Minister of Croatia
- In office 23 December 2003 – 6 July 2009
- Prime Minister: Ivo Sanader
- Preceded by: Željka Antunović; Slavko Linić; Goran Granić
- Succeeded by: Position vacant

Minister of Family, Veterans' Affairs and Intergenerational Solidarity
- In office 23 December 2003 – 6 July 2009
- Prime Minister: Ivo Sanader
- Preceded by: Ivica Pančić
- Succeeded by: Tomislav Ivić
Further offices held
Leader of the Opposition
In office 23 December 2011 – 21 May 2012
Prime Minister	Zoran Milanović
Preceded by	Zoran Milanović
Succeeded by	Tomislav Karamarko
President of the Croatian Democratic Union
In office 4 July 2009 – 21 May 2012
Deputy	Darko Milinović
Preceded by	Ivo Sanader
Succeeded by	Tomislav Karamarko
Member of the Croatian Parliament
In office 23 December 2011 – 28 December 2015
Constituency	V electoral district
In office 2 February 2000 – 22 December 2003
Constituency	V electoral district
In office 28 November 1995 – 2 February 2000
Preceded by	Branko Mikša
Succeeded by	District abolished
Constituency	XXVI electoral district

Personal details
- Born: 1 July 1953 (age 73) Lipik, PR Croatia, FPR Yugoslavia (modern Croatia)
- Party: Independent (2013–2015; 2015–present)
- Other political affiliations: SKH (until 1990); HDZ (1995–2013); Successful Croatia (2015)
- Spouses: Hrvoje Markulj (m. 1977; div. 1981); Ivo Škopljanac (m. 1984; div. 1993)
- Children: 1
- Parents: Mirko Kosor; Zorica Belan
- Education: University of Zagreb

Jadranka Kosor (Croatian pronunciation: [jǎdraːnka kɔ̂sɔr]; born 1 July 1953) is a Croatian politician and former journalist who served as Prime Minister of Croatia from 2009 to 2011. Kosor was the first and so far only woman to become Prime Minister of Croatia since independence.

Born in Lipik, Kosor graduated from the Zagreb Faculty of Law. She started working as a journalist at the Večernji list and later radio host for Croatian Radio, dealing with refugee issues and disabled war veterans of the Croatian War. She joined the Croatian Democratic Union (HDZ) in 1989 and was elected party vice-president and member of the Parliament at the 1995 election. Following the 2003 election Kosor became the Minister of Family, Veterans' Affairs and Inter-generational Solidarity in the Sanader's first and, later, Sanader's second cabinet. She ran in the 2005 presidential election, but lost to incumbent president Stjepan Mesić in the second round. After the abrupt resignation of Ivo Sanader, Kosor was approved to her new post as prime minister in July 2009, also becoming leader of her party. She was the party's candidate for prime minister in the 2011 general election, but HDZ lost in a landslide over the centre-left Kukuriku coalition, led by the Social Democratic Party. Kosor handed power to the new prime minister, Zoran Milanović, in December 2011.

As prime minister, Kosor failed to commit to structural reforms although she managed to prevent the country's budgetary meltdown with two budget revisions and the introduction of new taxes as a response to the ongoing economic crisis. During her tenure, she strongly advocated a zero-tolerance policy to political corruption and organized crime. This uncompromising stance, along with the new criminal code passed before her term began, opened the door to unprecedented efforts to combat corruption. This resulted in arrests of numerous influential business-people and politicians from across the political spectrum, although most of them were members of HDZ, which severely damaged the party's reputation. The discoveries made by prosecutors were far-reaching and criminal charges were even raised against former prime minister Ivo Sanader and Deputy Prime Minister Damir Polančec, who would later be charged with lengthy prison sentences for criminal activity and abuse of power. In foreign policy, Kosor and her Slovenian counterpart Borut Pahor were successful in solving the long-standing border dispute and she is credited with successfully finishing the negotiating process of the Croatian accession to the European Union. On 9 December 2011, she and President Ivo Josipović signed the EU Treaty of Accession in Brussels. A moderate conservative, Kosor ran for another term as party leader after losing the election, however, was defeated by the more conservative Tomislav Karamarko. After months of criticizing his leadership and the new party platform, she was expelled from HDZ by the party's High Court for damaging the party's reputation.

In 2021, Kosor was awarded with the Grand Order of Queen Jelena with Sash and Morning Star by President of Croatia Zoran Milanović for "extraordinary contribution to the international position and reputation of the Republic of Croatia" and for "the development of relations between the Republic of Croatia and the Croatian people and other states and peoples."

== Early life ==
Jadranka Kosor was born in Lipik to Zorica Belan and Mirko Kosor. She finished primary education in Pakrac. Her parents divorced when she was two, and she spent her childhood living with her grandmother. Her childhood friends describe her as a pretty, smart, and sociable girl that loved poetry and wrote songs. She contested a beauty pageant and was selected runner up for Miss Swimming Pool of Lipik. She studied in Zagreb, where she graduated in law and began working as a journalist from 1972 as a correspondent for Večernji list and Radio Zagreb. In 1971, her book of poetry Koraci was published by the Pakrac branch of Matica hrvatska. During the Croatian War of Independence, she worked as a radio-journalist and her show explored war topics such as refugee problems and disabled war veterans. She also worked briefly as a correspondent for the BBC during this time.

== Politics ==
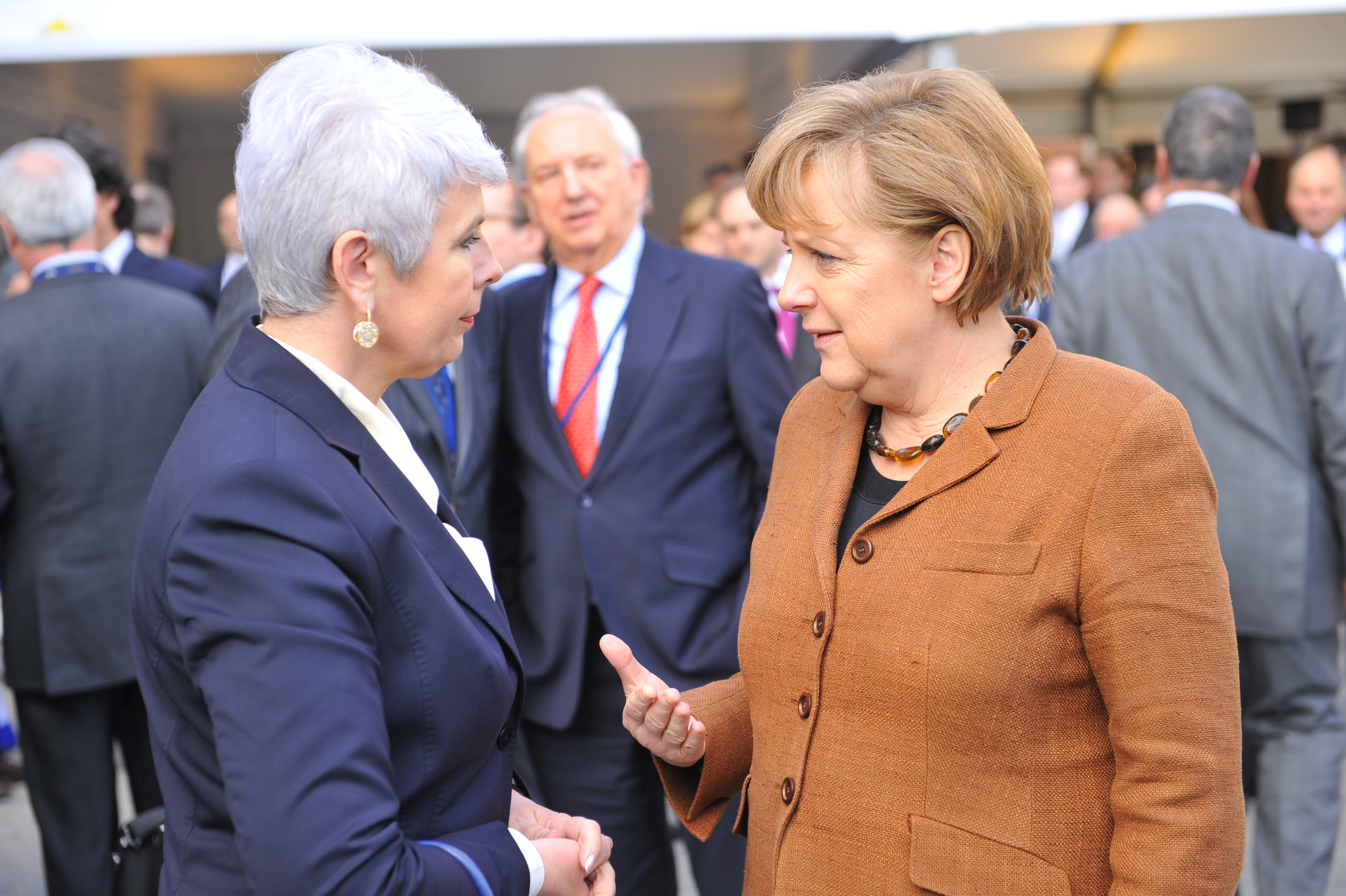
Kosor with German Chancellor Angela Merkel

In 1995, Kosor became a representative in the Croatian Parliament as a member of the Croatian Democratic Union (HDZ). She was also the vice-president of the Croatian Parliament. From 1999 to 2000, she was president of the HDZ's Women's Association Katarina Zrinski. She is credited with the number of female candidates from the HDZ in the 2000 elections doubling.

Kosor was the vice-president of the HDZ party between 1995 and 1997, and from 2002 up to 2009 when she became the president of the party. In 2003, she became the minister in the Croatian department for Family, Veterans and Inter-generational Solidarity in the Croatian Government of Ivo Sanader.

HDZ nominated her as their presidential candidate for the presidential election of 2005. In the first round, she overtook Boris Mikšić by a few percent to reach the second place. She then faced off Stipe Mesić in the second round, but lost.

In July 2009, she was politically installed as the head of the Croatian Democratic Union following the resignation of Ivo Sanader.

== Premiership (2009–2011) ==
On 1 July 2009, Croatian prime minister Ivo Sanader suddenly and unexpectedly resigned, and suggested Kosor as the next prime minister. With the support of the coalition partners Kosor went to the president Stjepan Mesić who invited her to form a government. This resulted in the formation of the Kosor cabinet which contained most members of the previous Sanader administration. On 6 July, Parliament approved the proposed cabinet with 83 votes in favor out of 153 members and Kosor was confirmed as the first female prime minister of Croatia after independence - actually the third in the history of the republic after two female prime ministers of Socialist Republic of Croatia. The Opposition was not pleased with this development calling Sanader a coward and Kosor his puppet saying that an early general election was necessary.

=== Domestic policy ===
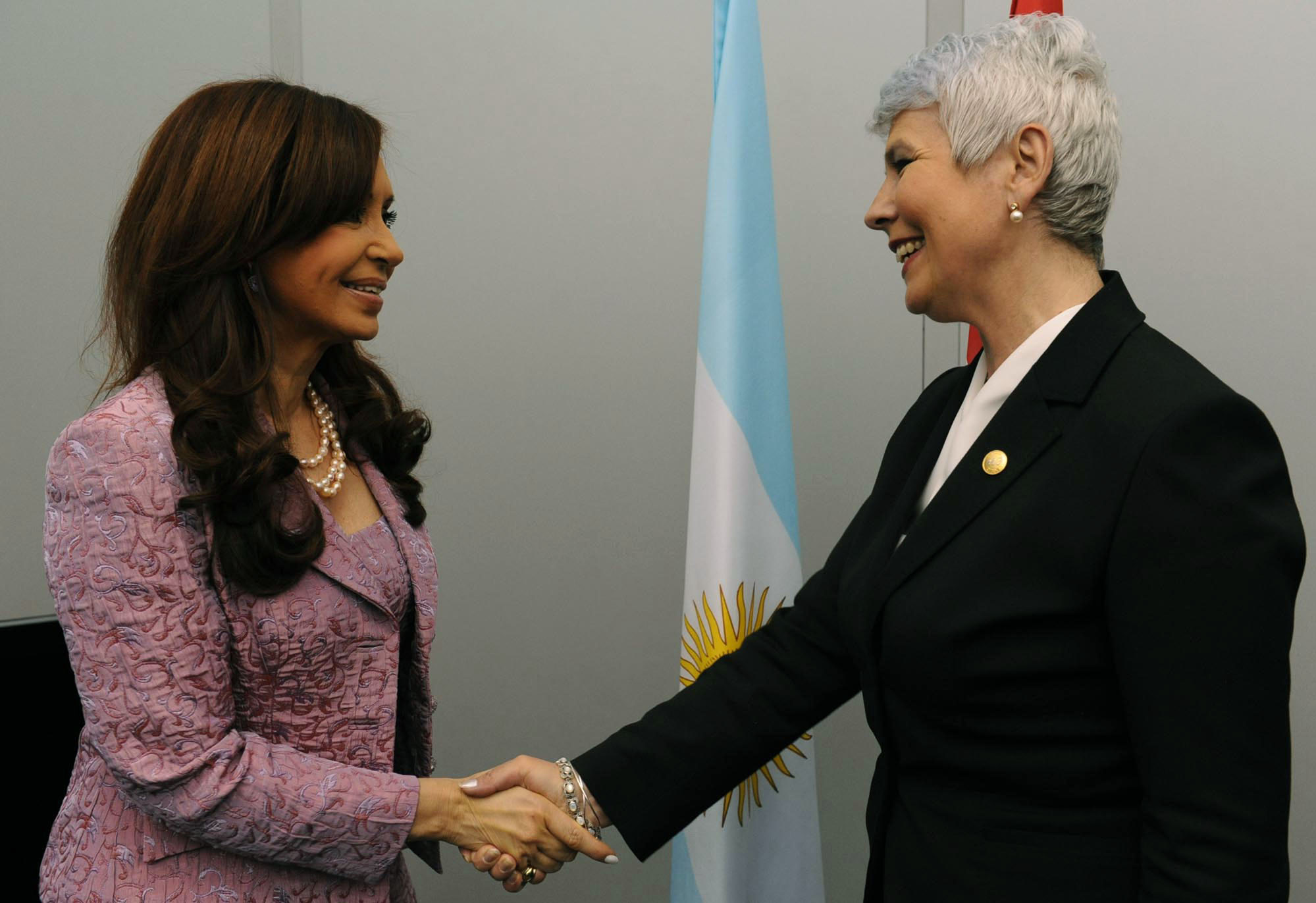
Kosor with Argentine President Cristina Fernandez de Kirchner in May 2010

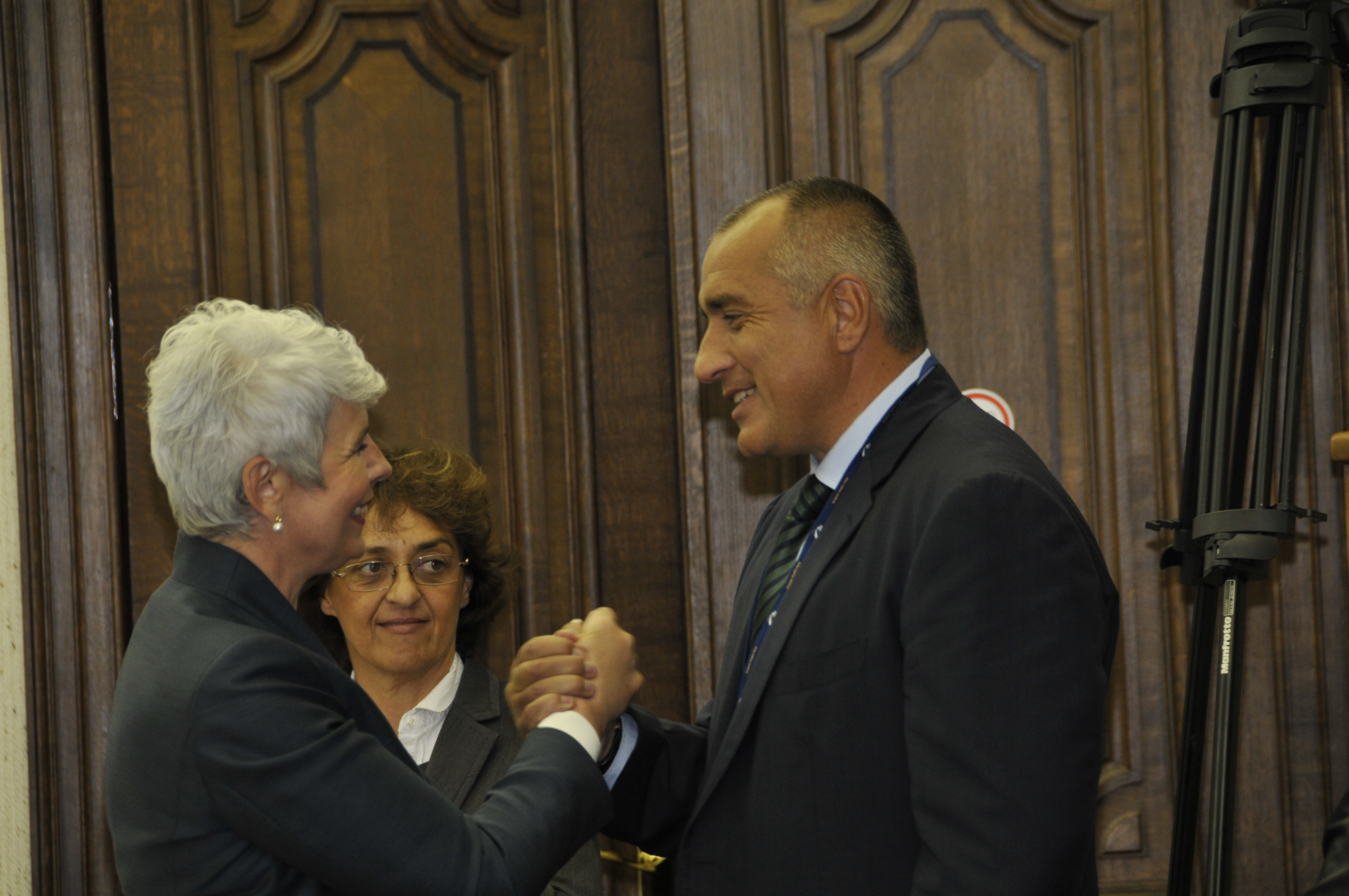
Kosor with Bulgarian Prime Minister Boyko Borisov at an EPP summit in Meise, September 2010

In the first month of her term Kosor, faced with a huge deficit and high unemployment, introduced an emergency budget aimed to reduce spending and the national debt. One of the most unpopular austerity measures taken along with the introduction of the budget was a new income tax called the "crisis tax" (krizni porez). In addition, the value-added tax rate was increased from 22% to 23%. Businesses criticized the tax hikes as well as the idea of tax code changes in the middle of the fiscal year as an unreasonable burden, while independent economists mostly noted how new taxes would cut consumer spending and further slow down the economy. The Opposition criticized the new measures heavily, calling the crisis tax harač, a historical Turkish loanword representing a tax implemented during the Ottoman Empire in the late Middle Ages. Indeed, the government's handling of finances was unpopular among the public resulting in the prime minister's dismal approval rating of 32% by the end of her first month.

In the last quarter of 2009, many public officials, as well as members of the boards of various government agencies, became suspected of participating in corrupt activities. An unprecedented number of officials were detained and arrested under these allegations which resulted in both praise and criticism of Kosor's government. The praise was mostly directed by those who believed that the government had finally taken a stronger stance against political corruption, while others criticized the fact that most suspects were, in fact, members of Kosor's own Croatian Democratic Union. The Opposition accused the government, especially the prime minister, for political responsibility, claiming that it was impossible that Kosor didn't know what was happening around her when she was a vice president of the government almost seven years before becoming prime minister. The accusations grew louder as more and more corruption affairs were tied with the former prime minister, Ivo Sanader. On 30 October 2009 Damir Polančec, member of the HDZ Presidency, resigned as deputy prime minister and minister of the economy following allegations of corruption.

On 3 January 2010, Ivo Sanader announced he was returning to active politics, saying it was a mistake he ever left. He accused Kosor and the members of the HDZ Presidency of failed leadership citing Andrija Hebrang's poor result in the first round of the presidential election held just a week earlier. Hebrang received, for HDZ as the largest party in the country, an embarrassing 12% of the votes claiming third place, the lowest result for an HDZ presidential candidate ever. Ivo Josipović, the candidate of the largest opposition party, the Social Democratic Party, won a landslide victory in the resulting runoff on 10 January. Most political pundits, as well as the majority of the public, believed the true reason of Sanader's surprise return was fear that he will eventually be tied with the numerous corruption scandals which have emerged since he left office. On 4 January, the day after Sanader's coup as it was called by the press, the HDZ Presidency decided to evict Sanader from the party. The Croatian public quickly rallied in support of Kosor against the hugely unpopular former prime minister, resulting in the highest support for any prime minister since polling began, topping at 77% by the end of February.

Throughout 2010, the economy topped corruption as the biggest concern of the government, and the enthusiasm for Kosor and her government soon wore off. Industry shed tens of thousands of jobs, and unemployment soared. Consumer spending reduced drastically compared to record 2007 levels, causing widespread problems in the trade as well as transport industries. The import/export balance did derive a benefit from a large decrease in imports and a more tempered decrease in exports. The continuing declining standard resulted in a quick fall in both the prime minister's as well as government's support. In June, Kosor proposed loosening the labor law and making it more business-friendly. This was greatly opposed by the unions who have organized a petition against the proposed changes demanding a referendum on the issue. The petition was signed by over 700,000 citizens, unprecedented in Croatia. Just as the 2010 Croatian labour law referendum was being prepared, the government decided to drop the proposed changes. The Constitutional Court ultimately declared the referendum issue moot, but ordered the government not to subject any changes to the labor law in the following year. This was seen as a legal way to avoid the referendum which many speculated would be a referendum on the Government rather than on the labor law. The unions criticized the move calling it undemocratic, announcing protests.

In August 2011, at the official celebration of Victory Day, Kosor sent a public greeting to Croatian generals Ante Gotovina and Mladen Markač who were in April of the same year found guilty in a first instance verdict of war crimes and crimes against humanity by ICTY. In 2012, they were both acquitted by the ICTY's Appeals Panel and released from custody. Kosor's statement was criticized by Serbian president Boris Tadić, leader of the Independent Democratic Serb Party (SDSS) Milorad Pupovac, Deputy Prime Minister Slobodan Uzelac (SDSS), as well as by leaders of the opposition Social Democratic Party and Croatian People's Party. Amnesty International expressed concerns.

=== Foreign relations ===
Jadranka Kosor signed an agreement with Borut Pahor, the prime minister of Slovenia, in November 2009, that ended Slovenia's blockade of Croatia's EU accession and allowed Croatian EU entry negotiations to proceed. On 9 December 2011, Prime Minister Kosor and President Ivo Josipović signed EU Accession Treaty in Brussels.

=== Standing in opinion polls ===
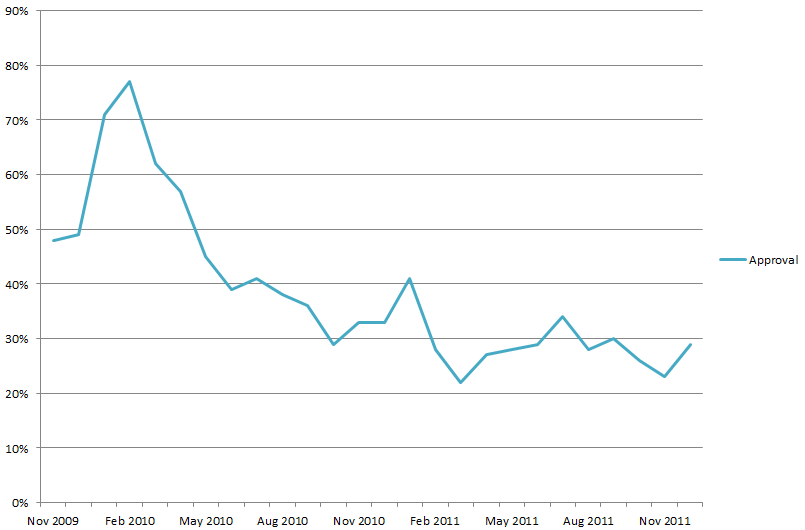
Kosor's approval ratings (IpsosPuls November 2009 – December 2011)

Jadranka Kosor's approval ratings
Date	Event	Approval (%)
1 August 2009	First month in office	32
29 January 2010	After expelling Sanader from the party	71
30 June 2010	Labour Union referendum	39
25 December 2010	Arrest of Ivo Sanader	33
25 November 2011	Last poll before losing the election	23
27 February 2010	Personal High	77
29 October 2010	Personal Low	22
	Career Average	39

== Post-premiership ==
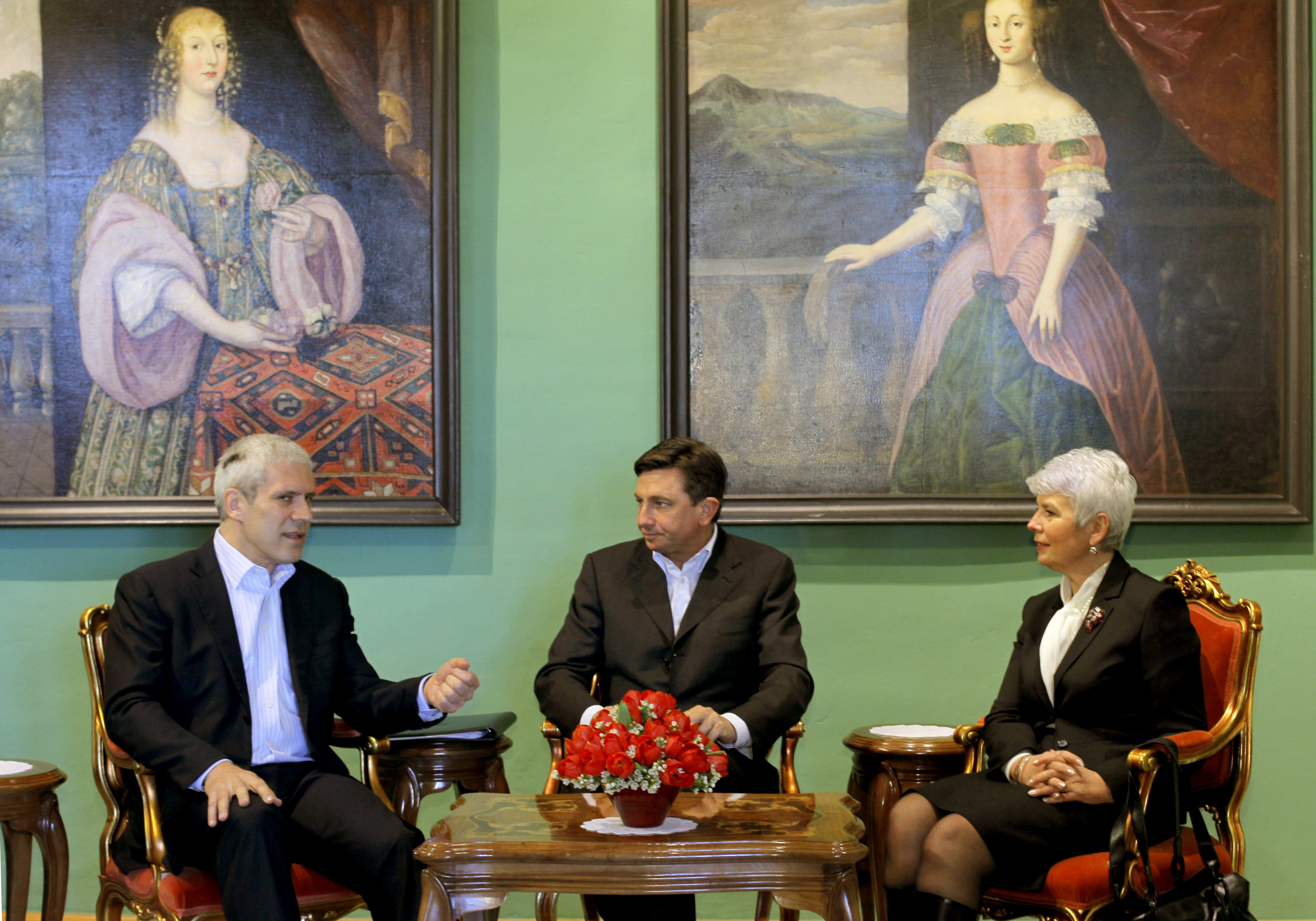
Kosor with Serbian President Boris Tadić and Slovenian Prime Minister Borut Pahor

Following HDZ's defeat at the 2011 parliamentary election, Kosor handed over power to newly elected prime minister, Social Democrat Zoran Milanović. On 23 December 2011, Kosor was elected Deputy Speaker of the Croatian Parliament and was also chairwoman of the HDZ's Deputy Club and leader of the opposition. Kosor contested 2012 HDZ leadership election and came in third out of five candidates. A moderate conservative, Kosor continuously publicly criticized Tomislav Karamarko's leadership and the new, more conservative, party platform. In 2012, she testified at the trial in the Fimi Media corruption case against Ivo Sanader. On 12 June 2012, Kosor and Vladimir Šeks were removed from the positions of Deputy Speakers. In 2013, she was expelled from HDZ for "damaging the reputation of the party".

Kosor continued as an independent, considerably more liberal, politician and eventually formed a deputy club with two Croatian Civic Party MPs. Kosor voted in favour of presenting the issue of the 2013 referendum on banning same-sex marriage before the Constitutional Court, and against the proposed Constitutional change which represented a change from her previous position on homosexuality and same-sex marriage since she had been known for being against the expansion of LGBT rights. She also voted for the Life Partnership Act which gave same-sex couples in Croatia rights equal to heterosexual married couples. After receiving death threats in 2015, Kosor was granted police protection. After speculation that she might be the SDP's candidate, Kosor eventually decided to participate in the 2015 parliamentary election as a candidate for the liberal Successful Croatia coalition in the 5th electoral district. She wasn't elected to the parliament. She continued to criticize Tomislav Karamarko and Kolinda Grabar-Kitarović as well as Bridge of Independent Lists party for their indecisiveness. In February 2016, she called on Prime Minister Tihomir Orešković to remove Zlatko Hasanbegović from the position of the minister of culture after photograph of him wearing a cap with an Ustaše badge was published. In August 2016, Kosor stated that yelling Za dom spremni was "an insult to war veterans and their friends who gave their lives for a democratic, independent, and free Croatia".

Kosor is very active on Twitter where she writes on daily events and statements by politicians. She also maintains a personal blog - "Day After Yesterday - On Obverses and Reverses of Politics". In 2017, she published a book which included texts she wrote on her blog and columns written for the Slovenian leftist newspaper Dnevnik in the period from 2015 to 2017 in which she commented on Croatian interior and foreign politics.

In 2023, she reached the semi-final of Croatia's Masked Singer.

== Personal life ==
Jadranka Kosor was married twice; between 1971 and 1981 to Hrvoje Markulj, an editor of the Croatian Radiotelevision Entertainment Program, and between 1984 and 1993 to Ivo Škopljanac, a radio host on the Croatian Radio, with whom she had a son. Their son Lovro Škopljanac (b. 1984) works as a senior assistant at the Department of Comparative Literature at the Zagreb Faculty of Humanities and Social Sciences. Ivo Škopljanac died in 2013.

She has published five books - two of poetry, two related to the Croatian War of Independence and one containing her comments on Croatian politics. Kosor received The Golden Pen Award of the Croatian Journalists' Association, European Union's Humanitarian Award, European Circle Award of the Croatian European House and HRT's Lifetime Achievement Award "Ivan Šibl". She is an honorary member of the Association of Parents of Deceased Veterans, Honorary Vice President of the Association of the Deafblind "Dodir", Honorary President of the Association of Homeland Defence War Veterans - HVIDRA, Honorary President of the Association of Croatian Homeland Defence War Veterans Treated for PTSD of the Šibenik-Knin County - "Tvrđava Knin" and Honorary President of the International Committee of Humanists for the Protection of Children and Families from Abuse and Violence.

== Honours ==
Award or decoration	Country	Date
Grand Order of Queen Jelena	Croatia	17 December 2021

Party political offices
Preceded by Mate Granić	Croatian Democratic Union nominee for President of Croatia; 2005	Succeeded by Andrija Hebrang
Preceded by Ivo Sanader	President of the Croatian Democratic Union; 2009–2012	Succeeded by Tomislav Karamarko
Political offices
Preceded by Ivo Sanader	Prime Minister of Croatia; 2009–2011	Succeeded by Zoran Milanović
Preceded by Zoran Milanović	Leader of the Opposition; 2011–2012	Succeeded by Tomislav Karamarko
