= Branka Primorac =

Croatian novelist and journalist

Branka Primorac (Zagreb, 1964) is a Croatian female novelist and journalist.

She attended Faculty of Political Sciences, of the University of Zagreb. She writes for newspapers Večernji list.

She wrote several children novels, thematising adolescence, Croatian War for Independence, culture, animals and love.

She was awarded Mato Lovrak and Anto Gardaš Prize.
