= Josip Jurčević =

Croatian historian and politician

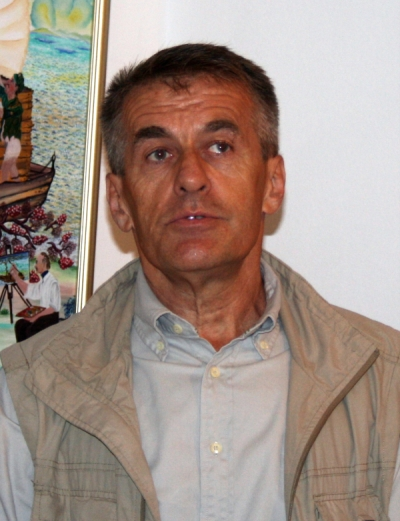

Member of Parliament
- Incumbent
- Assumed office 16 May 2024
- Constituency: VII electoral district

Personal details
- Born: 19 April 1951 (age 75) Studenci near Imotski, PR Croatia, FPR Yugoslavia
- Party: Independent
- Education: University of Zagreb
- Occupation: Professor, politician

Josip Jurčević (born April 19, 1951) is a Croatian historian and politician.

Born in the village of Studenci near the southern town of Imotski, Jurčević grew up in Zagreb. He graduated in history and philosophy from the Faculty of Humanities and Social Sciences, University of Zagreb in 1975. Josip Jurčević is the father of seven children.

He is the author of several books. At the University of Osijek and at the Pedagogical University in Petrinja he has teaching positions.

Josip Jurčević is a member of a Croatian War Veterans Association. The Nacional newspaper described him in 2006 as the new voice of the Croatian right.

Jurčević ran as an independent candidate in the 2009 presidential election where he won 2.74% of the vote and was eliminated in the first round.

In April 2012, Jurčević was a panelist at an event discussing freemasonry in Croatia, in which he described society as being organized according to the postulates described in the Protocols of the Elders of Zion.

== Research and views ==
In his book Prikrivena stratišta i grobišta jugoslavenskih komunističkih zločina Jurčević investigated 1,571 concealed execution sites and graves in Slovenia, Croatia, and Bosnia and Herzegovina from World War II and the postwar period. According to his analysis, Yugoslav Communists were responsible for 89% of the crimes on the researched sites, Italian fascists, Chetniks, Ustashas, and Nazis for 3-4%, while 8% of the sites were still not investigated. Based on his research, only 0.13% of crimes in "contemporary" Croatian history were committed by the Ustashas.

According to Christian Axboe Nielsen, associate professor of Southeast European Studies at Aarhus University, Jurčević has a track record of publishing works that explore repression and crimes against Croats while simultaneously also publishing works that deny Croatian crimes, whether during the World War II or during the 1990s, against others. Jurčević has dismissed the systematic and mass atrocities at the Jasenovac concentration camp as a "Serbian myth".

In his review of Jurčević's work, The Origin of the Jasenovac Myth, German historian Holm Sundhaussen notes that while Jurčević is justified in his criticism of communist Yugoslavia's Jasenovac casualty numbers, he "willingly and thoughtlessly" adopts the term "Jasenovac myth" and tries to demonstrate, through the omitting of information, that Jasenovac was a "labor camp" and that genocide in the WW2 Independent State of Croatia did not occur.

Jurčević is a member of the Society for Research of the Threefold Jasenovac Camp. The NGO claims that the Ustashas ran a labour camp at Jasenovac for enemies of the regime, but it says that the real death camp was run by the Yugoslav Communists, which imprisoned Ustasha members and regular Croatian Home Guard army troops until 1948, then alleged Stalinists until 1951. In television appearances, Jurčević has stated that the camp was not conceived for the systematic murder of people but that it was a "very productive work camp" ("Jasenovac je bio vrlo produktivan radni logor") and that the Ustasha movement was not fascist but was at odds with fascists.
