= Colemanballs =

Verbal gaffes of sports commentators

Colemanballs is a term coined by Private Eye magazine to describe verbal gaffes perpetrated by sports commentators. Coleman refers to the surname of the former BBC broadcaster David Coleman and the suffix -balls, as in "to balls up".

== Background ==
The term "balls" was first associated with Coleman in 1957 when he was at BBC Midlands, Sutton Coldfield, presenting a Saturday night 15-minute roundup of the day's football in the Midlands. A technical hitch occurred and there was a black-out, but Coleman could be heard calling out to the technician in the studio, "Trust you to make a balls of that." Coleman's association with these verbal slips is so strong that he is often given erroneous credit for the earliest example specifically referenced as a Colemanballs; in fact the broadcaster responsible was a fellow BBC commentator, Ron Pickering. At the 1976 Summer Olympics in Montreal, Pickering commentated on a race involving the Cuban double-gold medallist Alberto Juantorena, whose muscular build and nine-foot stride contributed to his nickname El Caballo (The Horse). Pickering said "and there goes Juantorena down the back straight, opening his legs and showing his class".

"Damien Hirst tends to use everyday objects like a shark in formaldehyde."

Until his retirement, motor racing commentator Murray Walker frequently featured in the column. His excitable delivery led to so many mistakes that they began to be labelled "Murrayisms". Examples include "We've had cars going off left, right and centre", "do my eyes deceive me, or is Senna's Lotus sounding rough?", "with half of the race gone, there is half of the race still to go", "There is nothing wrong with the car, apart from that it is on fire", "That car is totally unique, apart from the car behind it, which is identical", and "The gap between them is now nine-tenths of a second; that's less than a second!".

Private Eye's "Colemanballs" column has now expanded to include occasional quotes from sportsmen themselves (e.g. Frank Bruno's "That's cricket, Harry, you get these sort of things in boxing"), politicians (John Major's "When your back's against the wall it's time to turn round and fight"), and malapropisms from other public figures.

In the United States, Jerry Coleman, a former baseball player not related to David Coleman, became known for similar statements as an announcer, such as, "Rich Folkers is throwing up in the bullpen", and "Winfield goes back to the wall, he hits his head on the wall! And it rolls off! It's rolling all the way back to second base. This is a terrible thing for the Padres." In spite of these statements, which earned him the nickname "The Master of the Malaprop", he was honored by the Baseball Hall of Fame with the Ford Frick Award, their lifetime achievement award for announcers.

== Books ==
A series of Colemanballs books has been published by Private Eye. As of 2025, 15 editions have been released.

== See also ==
- Damaging quotation
- Malapropism
- Yogiisms
- Bushism
