= 2005 Croatian presidential election =

← 2000	2 January 2005 (first round); 16 January 2005 (second round)	2009–10 →
- Turnout: 50.57% (first round); 51.04% (second round)
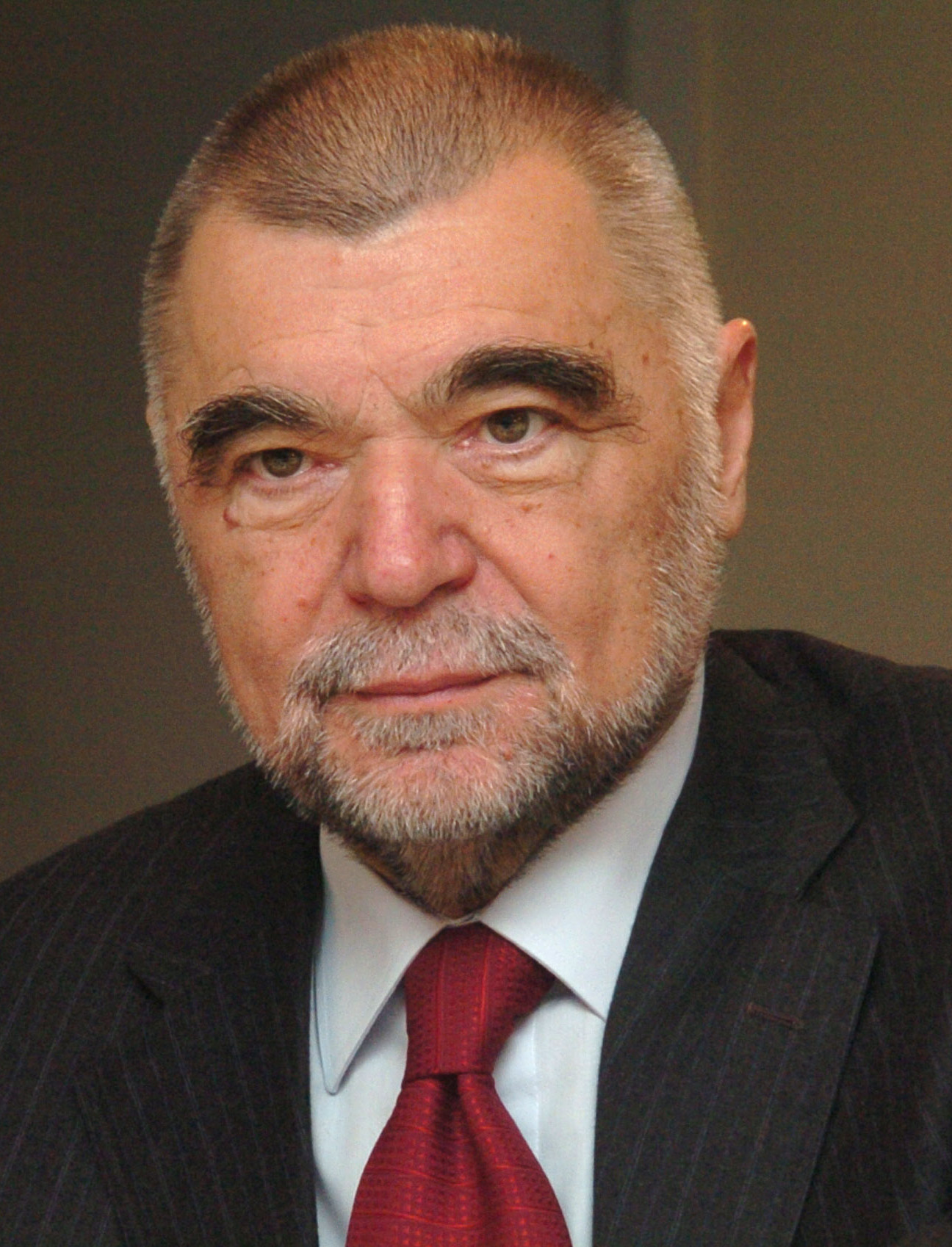

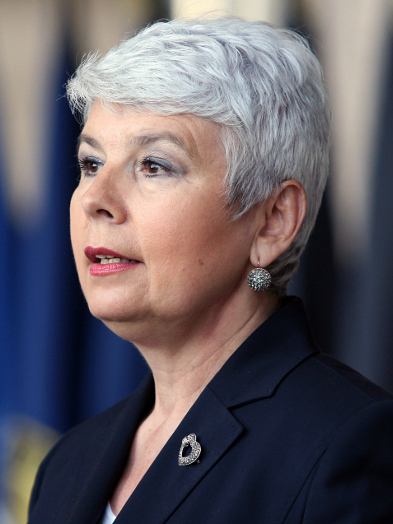
Nominee	Stjepan Mesić	Jadranka Kosor
Party	Independent (HNS)	HDZ
Popular vote	1,454,451	751,692
Percentage	65.93%	34.07%
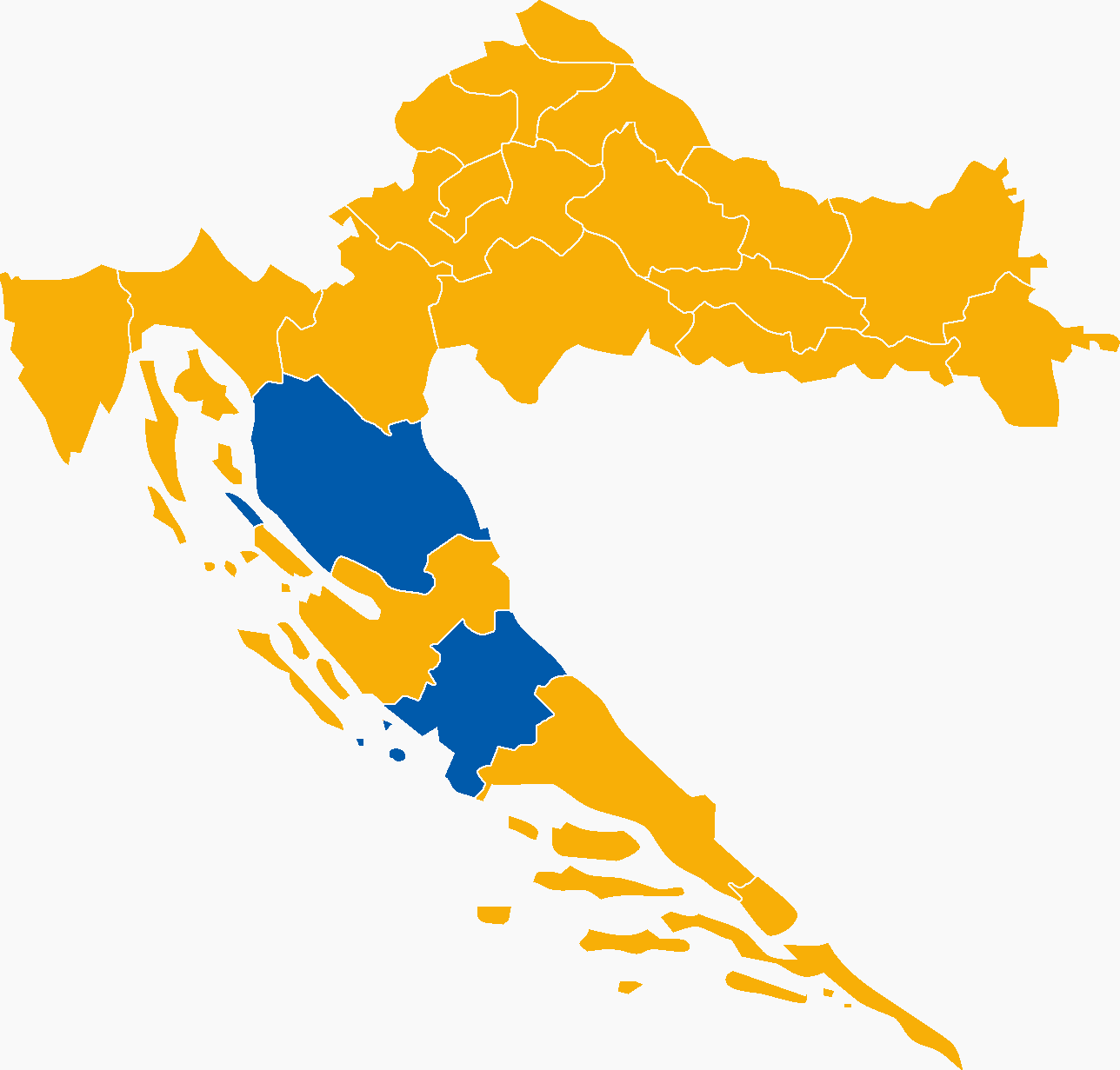
- Second round results by county Stjepan Mesić Jadranka Kosor
President before election
Stjepan Mesić
Independent
Elected President
Stjepan Mesić
Independent

Presidential elections were held in Croatia in January 2005, the fourth such elections since independence in 1991. They were the first presidential elections held after the constitutional reforms of November 2000, which replaced a semi-presidential system with an incomplete parliamentary system, greatly reducing the powers of the president in favor of the Prime Minister and the cabinet. Incumbent president Stjepan Mesić, who had been elected in 2000 as the candidate of the Croatian People's Party, was eligible to seek reelection to a second term and ran as an independent as the constitution prohibited the president from holding party membership while in office.

The elections resulted in the landslide re-election of Mesić for a second five-year term. They were also the first in which a woman, Croatian Democratic Union candidate Jadranka Kosor, took part in the runoff. The percentage of the vote received by Mesić in the second round – 66% – was the highest of any president until Zoran Milanović's victory in 2025. Mesić had received an absolute majority of the votes cast within Croatia itself in the first round, but the votes of Croatian citizens living abroad forced a run-off by reducing Mesić's overall percentage to just under the necessary 50% + 1 vote threshold needed to win in the first round. Voter turnout was 51% in both rounds.

Mesić was sworn in for a second term on 18 February 2005 by the Chief justice of the Constitutional Court.

== Background ==
The Croatian State Elections Committee published a list of potential candidates on 15 December 2004. President Stjepan Mesić stood for re-election, and the governing HDZ nominated cabinet minister Jadranka Kosor. A total of thirteen candidates were accepted, each after having submitted 10,000 citizen signatures, an endorsement required by law.

== Results ==
Candidate	Party	First round		Second round	
Candidate	Party	Votes	%	Votes	%
Stjepan Mesić	Croatian People's Party and others	1,089,398	49.37	1,454,451	65.93
Jadranka Kosor	Croatian Democratic Union	452,218	20.49	751,692	34.07
Boris Mikšić	Independent	396,093	17.95		
Đurđa Adlešič	Croatian Social Liberal Party	59,795	2.71		
Slaven Letica	Croatian Party of Rights	57,748	2.62		
Ljubo Ćesić	Independent	41,216	1.87		
Ivić Pašalić	Croatian Bloc–Movement for a Modern Croatia	40,637	1.84		
Anto Kovačević	Croatian Christian Democratic Union	19,145	0.87		
Miroslav Blažević	Independent	17,847	0.81		
Miroslav Rajh	Croatian Youth Party	14,766	0.67		
Doris Košta	Independent	8,271	0.37		
Mladen Kešer	Independent	7,056	0.32		
Tomislav Petrak	Croatian Popular Party	2,614	0.12		
Total		2,206,804	100.00	2,206,143	100.00
Valid votes		2,206,804	99.09	2,206,143	98.41
Invalid/blank votes		20,269	0.91	35,617	1.59
Total votes		2,227,073	100.00	2,241,760	100.00
Registered voters/turnout		4,403,933	50.57	4,392,220	51.04
Source: State Election Committee

== Analysis ==
Most polls before the first round predicted that incumbent president Stjepan Mesić would be reelected without a runoff, securing 50% + 1 vote. However, Jadranka Kosor benefited from the votes coming from the citizens living abroad, which narrowed the president's victory by only a couple of points, but enough to secure a second round. The greatest surprise of the election was the independent candidate Boris Mikšić, a Croatian businessman and entrepreneur living in the United States. His campaign was heavily based on the message of a 'Croatian dream', similar to the American dream he said he achieved during his career in the US. On the night of the election, the first exit polls indicated president Mesić might secure a second term without the need of a runoff, while Kosor and Mikšić were shown battling for second place. As the first results started coming in it was evident that Mesić was not going to secure 50% + 1 vote and that a runoff is inevitable. As votes from the citizens living abroad were tallied, Kosor overtook Mikšić, placing second and qualifying for the second round. The campaign began immediately the next day and during the two-week-long campaign, three presidential debates were held, one on each of Croatia's three major television networks. Despite most observers and post debate polls indicating Kosor won the debates, Mesić maintained his lead in the polls. As Election Day neared, the Kosor campaign exceeded all previous campaign spending records, trying to motivate the conservative base. On Election Day, as polls around the country closed at 7 pm, all television networks announced Mesić won a landslide victory based on the exit polls, which official results later confirmed. Kosor conceded and congratulated Mesić on his victory. After the elections, Boris Mikšić claimed the elections were fraud and that Mesić and Prime Minister Ivo Sanader made a deal of "bringing" Kosor in the second round. He claimed to have received 15,000 election ballots with serial numbers that were not evidented.
