= Vukšići =

Vukšići may refer to:

- Donji Vukšići, a village in Croatia
- Gornji Vukšići a village in Croatia
- Vukšići, Danilo, a hamlet in Danilo, Croatia
- Vukšići, Danilo Kraljice, a hamlet in Danilo Kraljice, Croatia
- Vukšići, Kokorići, a hamlet in Kokorići, Croatia
- Vukšići, Ljeskovac, a hamlet in Ljeskovac, Croatia
- Vukšići, Slavsko Polje, a hamlet in Slavsko Polje, Croatia
- Vukšići, Bosnia and Herzegovina, a village in Milići, Republika Srpska, Bosnia and Herzegovina
