= Elections in the Croatian Democratic Union =

Elections in Croatia

Since its founding in 1989, elections within the Croatian Democratic Union were held numerous times.

== 2002 leadership election ==
The Croatian Democratic Union controversial 2002 leadership election was held on 21 April 2002. Besides the incumbent party leader and former Prime Minister Ivo Sanader, two other candidates were running: Ivić Pašalić, former advisor of Croatian President Tuđman and Maja Freundlich, journalist and vice-president of HDZ.

Ivo Sanader won the elections with 51 percent of the votes, Ivić Pašalić finished second with 47 percent of votes, and Maja Freundlich was last, with 2 percent.

Sanader was first elected party chairman in April 2000. His goal was to transform HDZ into a modern conservative party. His course was challenged by Pašalić, who accused Sanader of having betrayed the legacy of the party’s founder and Croatia’s first president Franjo Tuđman.

In June 2002 Pašalić was expelled from the party, for damaging the party’s image and reputation.

== 2012 leadership election ==
The Croatian Democratic Union 2012 leadership election was held on 20 and 21 May 2012 after the party's defeat in the 2011 general election. Besides the incumbent party leader and former Prime Minister Jadranka Kosor, four other candidates were running: Milan Kujundžić, former Minister of Health Darko Milinović, former Minister of the Interior Tomislav Karamarko and former Deputy Prime Minister Domagoj Ivan Milošević. Karamarko won in the second ballot with 971 delegate votes.

=== Results ===
Candidates	First round		Runoff	
Candidate	Votes	%	Votes	%
Tomislav Karamarko	848	40.5	971	53
Milan Kujundžić	523	26.2	860	47
Jadranka Kosor	357	17.9		
Darko Milinović	169	8.5		
Domagoj Ivan Milošević	98	4.9		
Delegate votes:	1995	100	1831	100
Source: Official results

== 2016 leadership election ==
Next Croatian Democratic Union leadership elections are going to be held in April/May 2016. Beside the incumbent party leader and current Deputy Prime Minister Tomislav Karamarko, two other candidates expressed intentions in running for president's position: Ivica Jurjević, president of HDZ Founders' Club "Dr. Franjo Tuđman" and Vinko Vukadin, media advisor of HDZ.

== 2020 leadership election ==
The 2020 HDZ leadership elections were held on 15 March 2020. The incumbent party leader and prime minister Andrej Plenković was challenged by Miro Kovač, who was foreign minister in the cabinet of Tihomir Orešković between January and October 2016. Plenković was re-elected as party leader with almost 80% of the votes.

Plenković ran on a moderate conservative and pro-European platform, while Kovač vowed to steer the party in a right-wing nationalist direction. Thus, Plenković victory was also seen as a victory for HDZ's moderate wing.
