= Milan Ivkošić =

Croatian journalist

- Born: 23 July 1947; Zmijavci near Imotski, SFR Yugoslavia
- Died: 27 July 2025
- Occupation: Journalist
- Years active: 1970s–2025
- Notable credit: Večernji list

Milan Ivkošić (23 July 1947-27 July 2025) was a Croatian journalist writing for Večernji list.

He was born in a Catholic family in the village of Zmijavci near Imotski. Ivkošić started his journalist career in the 1970s as a journalist of the youth newspaper Tlo. He worked as a writer and editor, and in 1981 he became a columnist for the magazine Start. This was followed by radio and television columns. He was an editor for Večernji list, where he continued to write commentaries. Ivkošić was a conservative journalist, and wrote mainly about political subjects for Večernji list.
