= Damir Kajin =

Croatian politician

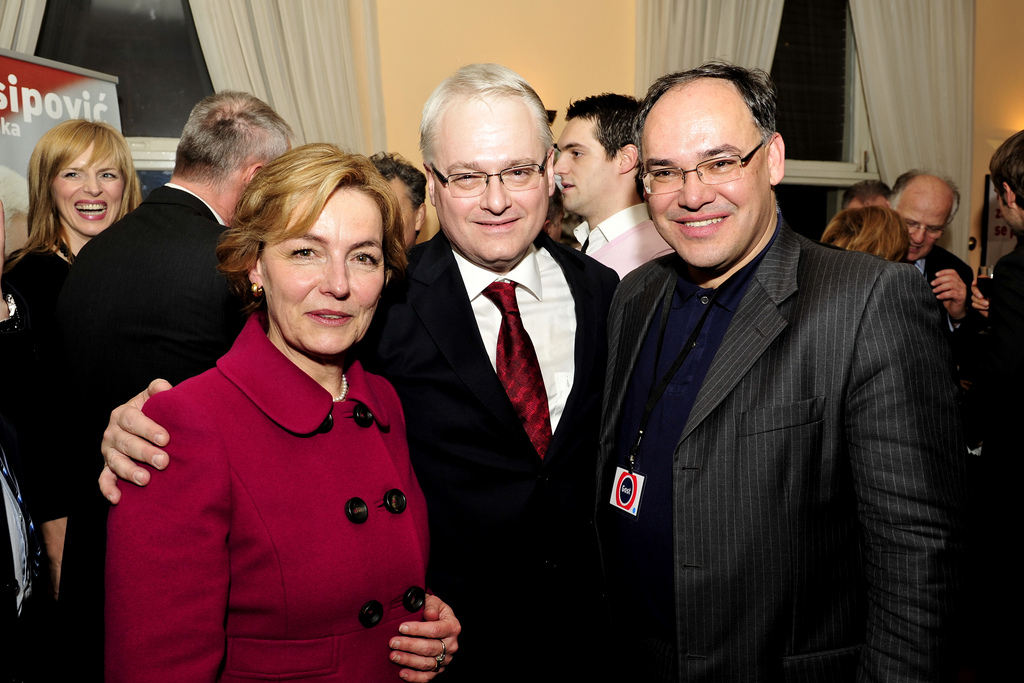
- Damir Kajin (right) with Ivo Josipović (centre) and Vesna Pusić (left)

Member of the Croatian Parliament
- In office 7 September 1992 – 28 December 2015

Personal details
- Born: 3 February 1962 (age 64) Koper, PR Slovenia, FPR Yugoslavia
- Party: Social Democratic Party (2021–present); Independent (before 2009, 2016–2021); Istrian Democrats (2013–2016); Istrian Democratic Assembly (2009–2013)

Damir Kajin (born 3 February 1962) is a Croatian politician.

Born in Koper, he grew up in Buzet where he completed elementary school subsequently attending high school in Rijeka. Before starting his political career as the president of the Istria County Assembly in 1993, Kajin worked in Istrian water supply company for 12 years. He remained president of the assembly until 2001.; In 1995 he was elected member of the Croatian Parliament where he served multiple mandates.

Kajin was the Istrian Democratic Assembly (IDS) candidate in the 2009 Croatian presidential election. He won 3.87% of the vote in the first round and was eliminated.

In 2013, Kajin was expelled from IDS. In 2014, he founded a new party, Istrian Democrats (Croatian: Istarski demokrati). In 2016, he left the Istrian Democrats. In 2021, he joined the Social Democratic Party and successfully ran on their list in the local elections, getting elected as the mayor of his hometown Buzet.
