= Slavko Vukšić =

Croatian politician and businessman

Slavko Vukšić (born 24 March 1949) is a Croatian politician and businessman. He is the leader of the minor regional political party the Democratic Party of Slavonia Plain (Croatian: Demokratska stranka slavonske ravnice).

Vukšić was born in Šaptinovci near Đurđenovac. In 1983 he graduated from a Zagreb polytechnic school as a safety engineer. Between 1973 and 1987 he worked for INA, when he switched to being a small businessman doing auto-transport and construction. Since 1993 he is the majority owner and director of the company "Kamenolom Gradac d.d." which operates stone-mining and various construction works.

Between 1996 and 2000 he was a member of the Croatian Parliament, elected in the 1995 Croatian parliamentary election under the banner of the Slavonia-Baranja Croatian Party. He also served as a deputy mayor of the town of Našice between 2005 and 2009.

He was a candidate on the 2009-2010 Croatian presidential election, supported by 12,500 signatures submitted to the electoral commission on November 16, 2009. He came in last out of 12 candidates winning 8,309 votes or 0.42% of the vote.
