= Damaging quotation =

Short utterance by a public figure; discrediting tactic

A damaging quotation is a short utterance by a public figure, and used by opponents as a discrediting tactic. These quotations may be inserted or alluded to in negative political ads to discredit the character or intellectual ability of the originator. More typically, however, they are used in political arguments by both politicians and political pundits often in ways which are fallacious.

These quotations are compiled into books or posted on the internet and are repeated in other contexts such as in talk radio or in the United States by stand-up comedians in late-night television monologues. The publication of these quotations is justified as a necessary part of maintaining an informed citizenry.

In cases where the quotation in question is taken widely out of context it can be difficult for a candidate to find recourse, even though it is very easy to check the accuracy and the context of a quotation by using internet resources (such as search engines); in popular jargon, the quotation (especially if humorous) can grow into a meme.

== Categories ==
There are various common categories of quotations: malapropisms or grammatical errors, exaggerations about past achievements, lack of conviction, consorting with the enemy, moral turpitude, indifference towards victims of crime, racist or discriminatory, etc.

In the case of malapropisms, it is a rhetorical fallacy (called argument ad hominem) to conclude that the entire argument of whoever made the utterance is incorrect. Yet it has become common in partisan argument in the United States. For instance: former U.S. Vice President Al Gore, during an interview with Wolf Blitzer on CNN (March 9, 1999) stated, "During my service in the United States Congress, I took the initiative in creating the Internet. I took the initiative in moving forward a whole range of initiatives that have proven to be important to our country's economic growth and environmental protection, improvements in our educational system." This has frequently been distorted by opponents to say that Gore claimed, "I invented the Internet." Partisans have so often used this distorted quotation to discredit him that Internet pioneer Vint Cerf (and others who participated in actually inventing the Internet) have made a point of noting Gore's support and the error of the discreditors.

With the availability of inexpensive computers and the widespread use of the Internet, it has become easy for anyone to accumulate and distribute these quotation lists. Like the "Yogiisms" of baseball great Yogi Berra, or the Colemanballs collected by Private Eye, a damaging quotation purports to give insight into the thinking of the speaker, frequently a politician or of the politicians or political groups that used it as means of attack. As such they belong to the colorful history of political satire.
