= Danilo Kraljice =

Settlement in Šibenik-Knin County, Croatia

- Settlement
- Interactive map of Danilo Kraljice
- Location of Danilo Kraljice in Croatia
- Coordinates: 43°43′37″N 16°05′33″E
- Country: Croatia
- County: Šibenik-Knin
- City: Šibenik

Area
  - Total: 6.1 km^{2} (2.4 sq mi)

Population (2021)
  - Total: 87
  - Density: 14/km^{2} (37/sq mi)
- Time zone: UTC+1 (CET)
  - Summer (DST): UTC+2 (CEST)
- Postal code: 22323 Unešić
- Area code: +385 (0)22

Danilo Kraljice is a settlement in the City of Šibenik in Croatia. In 2021, its population was 87.

== Demographics ==
Danilo Kraljice: Population trends 1857–2021
v

population			53	194	199	170			361	396	416	315	249	182	128	104	87
	1857	1869	1880	1890	1900	1910	1921	1931	1948	1953	1961	1971	1981	1991	2001	2011	2021

Sources: Croatian Bureau of Statistics publications
