= Boris Mikšić =

Croatian businessman and politician

Boris Mikšić (born 11 October 1948 in Zagreb) is a Croatian businessman and politician.

Mikšić was born in Zagreb, then part of SFR Yugoslavia. He graduated from the University of Zagreb Faculty of Mechanical Engineering and Naval Architecture in 1973. He then emigrated to the United States of America, settling in Minnesota where he gradually began his business, Cortec Corporation. Over the years he became one of the wealthiest Croatian Americans. He first ventured into the Croatian politics as an independent candidate in the 2003 parliamentary elections.

In 2005, he ran as an independent candidate in the Croatian presidential election. His campaign was partially based on his autobiography Američki san dečka s Trešnjevke (American dream of a kid from Trešnjevka) that he had published in 1994 - creating image of a simple Zagreb youth, who fulfilled the American Dream. It was also based on his opposition to the ICTY and Eurosceptic views. His success story along with his self-funded American-style campaign brought a new perspective to many voters.

On 2 January, to the surprise of many, first election projections showed him as winning 2nd place, knocking the government's candidate Jadranka Kosor out of the race. Immediately, many commentators began to interpret his success as a protest vote against the Croatian political establishment, engulfed in corruption and being notoriously inefficient. As if Mikšić, already wealthy has been seen by voters as more decent and less corruptible candidate.

Few hours later, new projections, based on the votes cast by Croatian citizens in neighboring Bosnia and Herzegovina, brought Jadranka Kosor to the 2nd place. Mikšić was surprised as was the most of Croatian public. At first he refused to accept results and blamed the failure on alleged vote fraud, and "dead people voting". He called supporters to demonstrate on streets over the alleged fraud, inspired by the, at the time current, Orange Revolution in Ukraine. He later called off planned demonstrations, citing his respect for the law and wanting to prevent incident and possible casualties brought on by the protest.

Following the presidential elections, Mikšić continued to challenge the results, bringing allegations of voter fraud. He requested vote recounts from Croatia's Constitutional Court stating that many deceased people were not only registered to vote but also cast votes in the election; a problem that the Croatian government has faced multiple times. He continued to pursue Croatian politics, announcing his candidacy in local elections, including those for Zagreb City Assembly. Mikšić's campaigning appeared to have effect within the 2005 local elections. His slate did enter the Zagreb City Assembly, but with only three seats, which was fewer than he expected.

Mikšić entered into the Croatian presidential election, 2009–2010, but was eliminated in the first round with 2.1% of the vote.
