= Večernji list =

Croatian daily newspaper

- Front page of the 3 February 2012 issue
- Type: Daily newspaper
- Format: Berliner
- Owner: Styria Media Group
- Publisher: Večernji list d.d.
- Editor-in-chief: Dražen Klarić
- Founded: 1959; 67 years ago
- Political alignment: Conservatism
- Language: Croatian
- Headquarters: Slavonska avenija
- City: Zagreb
- Country: Croatia
- Circulation: 60,579 (as of October 2014)
- ISSN: 0350-5006
- Website: www.vecernji.hr

Večernji list (lit. 'The Evening Paper'; also known as Večernjak) is a Croatian and Bosnian-Herzegovinian daily newspaper published in Zagreb and Mostar. It is one of three top Croatian newspapers. It also organizes Večernjakova ruža since 1995, oldest Croatian media awards.

== History and profile ==
Večernji list was started in Zagreb in 1959. Its predecessor Večernji vjesnik ('The Evening Courier') appeared for the first time on 3 June 1957 in Zagreb on 24 pages but quickly merged with Narodni list ('The National Paper') to form what is today known as Večernji list.

Večernji list is considered a conservative-leaning newspaper.

== Editions ==
Večernji list formerly had multiple regional and two foreign editions:

- Dalmatia
- Istria-Primorje-Lika
- Slavonia and Baranja
- Podravina and Bilogora
- Varaždin and Međimurje
- Zagorje
- Sisak
- Karlovac
- Zagreb
- Bosnia and Herzegovina
- International edition

In 2012, all of the Croatian regional editions were merged, so four editions remain: Zagreb, Croatia, Bosnia-Herzegovina and World.

== Croatia to the World ==
In February 2021, Večernji list, in collaboration with the Academy of Fine Arts and the Croatian Society of Fine Artists (HDLU), compiled a list of the 38 Croatians (ethnically Croat or connected to Croatia) who contributed the most to the world, influencing global history. They organized an exhibition held at the Meštrović Pavilion, titled "From Croatia to the World" (Hrvatska svijetu), including over a thousand items connected to the thirty-eight personages. The first twelve names were chosen in 2019, but the list was then extended to a total of 38 by February 2021. The list includes: Ivo Andrić, Giorgio Baglivi, Josip Belušić, Roger Joseph Boscovich, Ivana Brlić-Mažuranić, Ivan Česmički, Marin Getaldić, Franjo Hanaman, Jerome, Marcel Kiepach, Julije Klović, Slavko Kopač, Benedikt Kotruljević, Zinka Kunc-Milanov, Antun Lučić, Giovanni Luppis, Dora Maar, Marko Marulić, Ivan Meštrović, Andrija Mohorovičić, Franciscus Patricius, Slavoljub Eduard Penkala, Marco Polo, Herman Potočnik, Vladimir Prelog, Mario Puratić, Lavoslav Ružan, Andrea Schiavone, David Schwartz, Pope Sixtus V, Mia Slavenska, Andrija Štampar, Rudolf Steiner, Nikola Tesla, Milka Trnina, Faust Vrančić, Ivan Vučetić, and Nikola IV Zrinski.

== Bibliography ==
- Popović, Helena; Bilić, Paško; Jelić, Tomislav; Švob-Đokić, Nada (29 October 2010). "The case of Croatia". Media policies and regulatory practices in a selected set of European countries, the EU and the Council of Europe (PDF). Athens: The Mediadem Consortium. pp. 77–107. Archived from the original (PDF) on 2 January 2015.
