= Bosnian Wikipedia =

Bosnian-language edition of Wikipedia

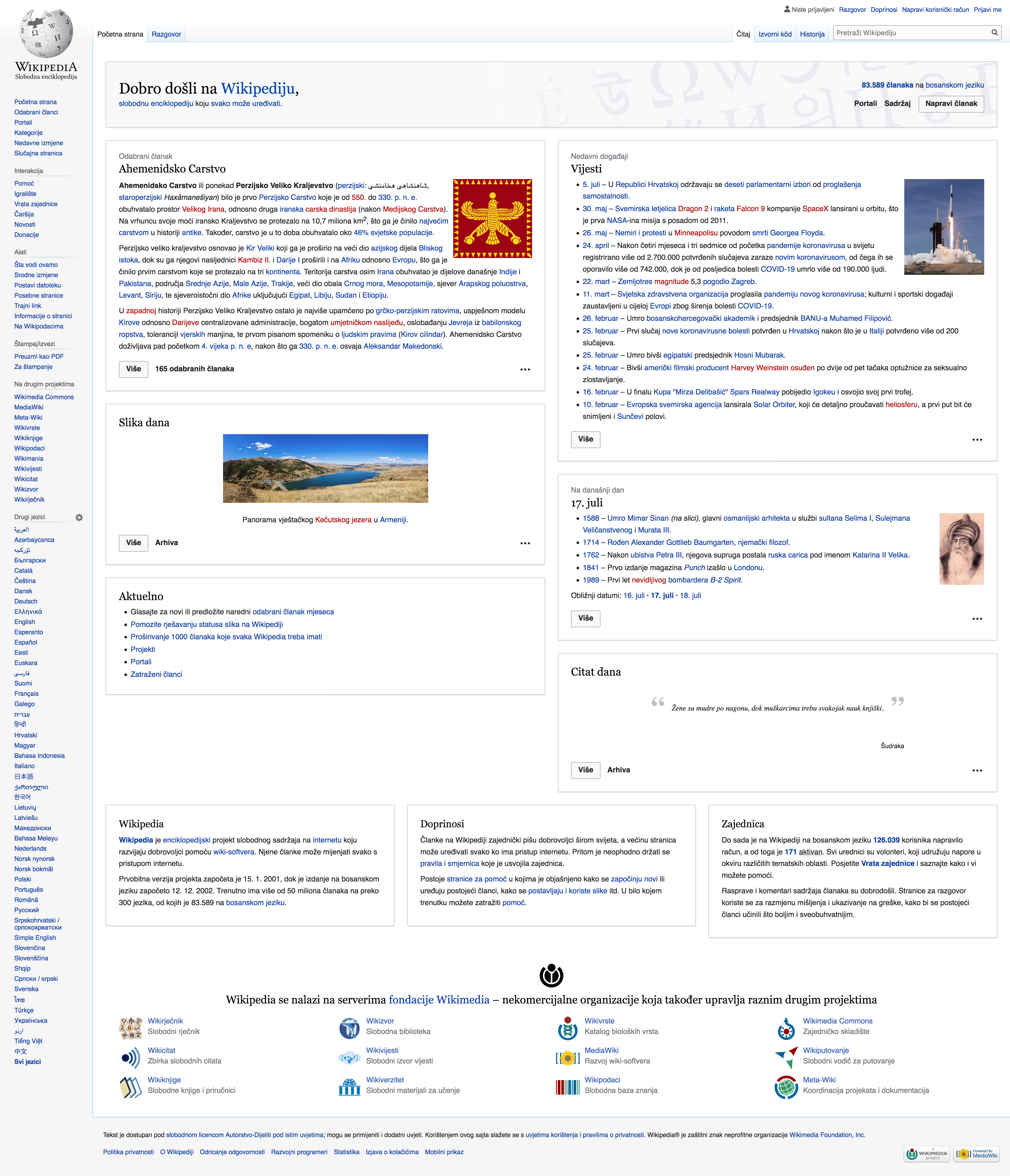
- Screenshot The homepage of the Bosnian Wikipedia.
- Website type: Internet encyclopedia project
- Available in: Bosnian
- Headquarters: Miami, Florida
- Owner: Wikimedia Foundation
- Website: bs.wikipedia.org
- Commercial: No
- Registration: Optional
- Launched: 12 December 2002; 23 years ago
- Content license: Creative Commons Attribution/ Share-Alike 4.0 (most text also dual-licensed under GFDL); Media licensing varies

The Bosnian Wikipedia (Bosnian: Wikipedia na bosanskom jeziku) is the Bosnian language version of Wikipedia, hosted by the Wikimedia Foundation. As of 19 September 2026, it has 98,748 articles. It was created on 12 December 2002, and its first article was Matematika.

== Community ==
On 17 February 2007, members of the Bosnian wiki community held the first in-person meet-up event in Sarajevo. Another meeting was held in the same year, followed by meetings in 2008 and 2011.

== Media coverage ==
Between 2021 and 2022, several Bosnian Wikipedia administrators were a target of accusations by several anonymous tabloid sources of promoting "Croatian nationalist political agenda". The articles alleged that "a group of academics, professors and students from Sarajevo with profession in the field of history and politics" faced selective reverting without explanation, negation of Bosnian national identity in favor of ethnic labels (Bosniak, Croat, Serb), as well as discrediting of "eminent historians" as reliable sources in articles, favoring "unreliable web portals" instead. In November 2022, an anonymously written article from Preporod, the official gazette of the Islamic Community in Bosnia and Herzegovina, repeated the concerns and called for founding of the local "Wikimedia Bosnia and Herzegovina" chapter which would financially and systemically influence the editing practices of Bosnian Wikipedia. None of the authors reached out to or interviewed any Bosnian Wikipedia editors, including the administrators involved, with the latter refuting these accusations based on Wikipedia's policies against original research, editorial synthesis, and meatpuppetry.

== Notes ==
- The Bosnian language officially uses two scripts, Latin and Cyrillic; however, the Bosnian-language Wikipedia does not feature a script converter like the Serbian and Serbo-Croatian language editions do.
- Bosnian is one of four standardized varieties of the Serbo-Croatian pluricentric language, making the practice of copying content between the four Wikipedias (Serbo-Croatian, Serbian, Croatian, Bosnian) with none or minimal textual changes easy and common.
