= Conflict-of-interest editing on Wikipedia =

Inappropriate contributions to Wikipedia

A conflict of interest (COI) occurs when editors use Wikipedia to advance the interests of their external roles or relationships. The type of COI editing that compromises Wikipedia the most is paid editing for public relations (PR) purposes. Several policies and guidelines exist to combat conflict of interest editing, including Wikipedia's conflict of interest guideline and the Wikimedia Foundation's paid-contribution disclosure policy.

Controversies reported by the media include United States congressional staff editing articles about members of Congress in 2006; Microsoft offering a software engineer money to edit articles on competing code standards in 2007; the PR firm Bell Pottinger editing articles about its clients in 2011; and the discovery in 2012 that British MPs or their staff had removed criticism from articles about those MPs. The media has also written about COI editing by BP, the Central Intelligence Agency, Diebold, Portland Communications, Sony, the Holy See, and several others.

In 2012, Wikipedia launched one of its largest sockpuppet investigations, when editors reported suspicious activity suggesting 250 accounts had been used to engage in paid editing. Wikipedia traced the edits to a firm known as Wiki-PR and the accounts were banned. 2015's Operation Orangemoody uncovered another paid-editing scam, in which 381 accounts were used to extort money from businesses to create and ostensibly protect promotional articles about them.

== Wikipedia on conflict-of-interest editing ==
Wikipedia is edited by volunteer contributors. The conflict-of-interest Wikipedia guideline is a "generally accepted standard that editors should attempt to follow". This guideline strongly discourages COI editing and advises those with a financial conflict of interest, including paid editors, to refrain from direct article editing. The paid-contribution-disclosure policy, which has legal ramifications, requires that editors disclose their "employer, client, and affiliation" with respect to any contribution for which they are paid, including talk-page contributions.

On 21 October 2013, Sue Gardner, then-executive director of the Wikimedia Foundation, condemned paid editing for promotional purposes. The law firm Cooley LLP, in a cease and desist letter to Wiki-PR, wrote that "this practice violates the Wikimedia Foundation's terms of use, including but not limited to Section 4, which prohibits users from 'engaging in false statements, impersonation, or fraud', and '...misrepresenting your affiliation with any individual or entity, or using the username of another user with the intent to deceive'". In 2014, the Wikimedia Foundation updated their terms of use to require that editors disclose their "employer, client, and affiliation with respect to any contribution for which [they] receive, or expect to receive, compensation".

== Laws against covert advertising ==
=== United States Federal Trade Commission ===
The Federal Trade Commission has published a guide to its regulations to implement federal law concerning the use of endorsements and testimonials in advertising at Endorsement Guidelines and Dot Com Disclosures.

=== European fair trading law ===
In May 2012, the Munich Oberlandesgericht court confirmed a ruling against a company that edited Wikipedia articles with the aim of influencing customers. The court viewed the edits as undeclared commercial practice according to The Act against unfair Competition Section 4, 3 as it constituted covert advertising, and as such were a violation of European fair trading law (see the Unfair Commercial Practices Directive). The ruling stated that readers cannot be expected to seek out user and talk pages to find editors' disclosures about their corporate affiliation. The case arose out of a claim against a company by a competitor over edits made to the article Weihrauchpräparat on the German Wikipedia.

The Advertising Standards Authority (ASA) in the UK reached a similar decision in June 2012 in relation to material about Nike on Twitter. The ASA found that the content of certain tweets from two footballers had been "agreed with the help of a member of the Nike marketing team." The tweets were not clearly identified as Nike marketing communications, and were therefore in breach of the ASA's code.

== Incidents ==
=== 2000s ===
==== Jimmy Wales ====
In December 2005, it was found that Wikipedia co-founder Jimmy Wales had edited his own Wikipedia entry. As of 9 September 2023, he had seven times altered information about whether Larry Sanger was a co-founder of Wikipedia. It was also revealed that Wales had edited the Wikipedia article of his former company, Bomis. "Bomis Babes", a section of the Bomis website, had been characterized in the article as "soft-core pornography", but Wales revised this to "adult content section" and deleted mentions of pornography. He said he was fixing an error, and did not agree with calling Bomis Babes soft porn. Wales conceded that he had made the changes, but maintained that they were technical corrections.

==== MyWikiBiz ====
In August 2006, Gregory Kohs, a market researcher from Pennsylvania, founded MyWikiBiz, a company offering to write inexpensive Wikipedia entries for businesses. In January 2007, Kohs said that in his view Wikipedia's coverage of major corporations was deficient, stating that "It is strange that a minor Pokémon character will get a 1,200-word article, but a Fortune 500 company will get ... maybe 100 words". A few days after issuing a press release about his business, Kohs' Wikipedia account was blocked. Kohs later recalled a phone call with Jimmy Wales, who told him MyWikiBiz was "antithetical" to the mission of the encyclopedia. Kohs said it surprised him that PR agencies were discouraged from editing articles: "There are around 130 'Fortune 1,000' companies absent from Wikipedia's pages ... How could they not benefit from a little PR help?"

==== Microsoft ====
In January 2007, Australian software engineer Rick Jelliffe revealed that Microsoft had offered to pay him to edit Wikipedia articles on two competing code standards, OpenDocumentFormat and Microsoft Office Open XML. Jelliffe, who described himself as a technical expert and not an advocate for Microsoft, said he accepted the offer because he wanted the information on technical standards to be accurate. Microsoft subsequently confirmed that it had offered to pay Jelliffe to edit the articles, stating that they were seeking "more balance" in the entries, that articles contained inaccuracies, that prior efforts to get attention from Wikipedia volunteers had failed, and that Microsoft had agreed that the company would not review Jelliffe's suggested changes. Microsoft also said they had not previously hired anyone to edit Wikipedia.

Heated debate resulted after the revelation over whether such practices called Wikipedia's credibility into question. In response to the incident, Jimmy Wales said paying for edits to Wikipedia was against the encyclopedia's spirit. Wales said the better, more transparent choice would have been for Microsoft to produce a white paper on the subject, post it online, and link to it from Wikipedia. He also stated "Although agencies and employees should not edit our pages, they do – but perhaps less than you would expect."

David Gerard, a Wikipedian, said "[Wikipedia] tends not to look favorably in terms of conflict of interest, and paying someone is a conflict." Gerard added that public relations representatives commonly get blocked from editing by Wikipedia administrators.

In the same month that had seen conflict of interest issues raised by both Microsoft and MyWikiBiz, Wales stated that editors should not be paid to edit, and PR agencies would be banned if they persisted.

==== WikiScanner ====
In 2007, Virgil Griffith created a searchable database that linked changes made by anonymous Wikipedia editors to companies and organizations from which the changes were made. The database cross-referenced logs of Wikipedia edits with publicly available records pertaining to the internet IP addresses edits were made from.

Most of the edits WikiScanner found were minor or harmless, but further analysis detected more controversial and embarrassing instances of conflict of interest edits. These instances received media coverage worldwide. Included among the accused were the Vatican, the CIA, the Federal Bureau of Investigation, the US Democratic Party's Congressional Campaign Committee, the US Republican Party, Britain's Labour Party, Britain's Conservative Party, the Canadian government, Industry Canada, the Department of Prime Minister, Cabinet, and Defence in Australia, the United Nations, the US Senate, the US Department of Homeland Security, the US Environmental Protection Agency, Montana Senator Conrad Burns, Ohio Governor Bob Taft, the Israeli government, ExxonMobil, Walmart, AstraZeneca, Diebold, Dow Chemical, Disney, Dell, Anheuser-Busch, Nestlé, Pepsi, Boeing, Sony, Electronic Arts, SCO Group, Myspace, Pfizer, Raytheon, DuPont, the Church of Scientology, the World Harvest Church, Amnesty International, the Discovery Channel, Fox News, CBS, The Washington Post, the National Rifle Association of America, News International, Al Jazeera, Bob Jones University, and Ohio State University.

Although the edits correlated with registered IP addresses, WikiScanner's data provided no proof that the changes came from a member of an organization or employee of a company, only that the changes were authored by someone with access to their network.

Wikipedia spokespersons received WikiScanner positively, noting that it helped prevent conflicts of interest from influencing articles as well as increasing transparency and mitigating attempts to remove or distort relevant facts.

==== Church of Scientology ====
In 2008, a long-running dispute between members of the Church of Scientology and Wikipedia editors reached Wikipedia's Arbitration Committee. The church members were accused of attempting to sway articles in the church's interest, while other editors were accused of the opposite. The arbitration committee unanimously voted to block all edits from the IP addresses associated with the church; several Scientology critics were also banned.

=== 2010s ===
==== Koch brothers ====
In 2010, Koch Industries began employing New Media Strategies (NMS), an internet PR firm specializing in word-of-mouth marketing. Shortly afterwards, it was discovered that employees of the company, editing from IPs controlled by NMS, were editing the Wikipedia articles for Charles Koch, David Koch, Political activities of the Koch brothers, and The Science of Success (a book written by Charles). Under numerous usernames, NMS employees edited Wikipedia articles "to distance the Koch family from the Tea Party movement, to provide baseless comparisons between Koch and conspiracy theories surrounding George Soros, and to generally delete citations to liberal news outlets." These activities were exposed at Wikipedia and described in the press.

==== London-based "PR fixer" ====
In June 2011, PR Week reported on a "fixer", a known but unnamed London-based figure in the PR industry, who offered services to "cleanse" articles. Wikipedia entries this person was accused of changing included Carphone Warehouse co-founder David Ross, Von Essen Group chairman Andrew Davis, British property developer David Rowland, billionaire Saudi tycoon Maan Al-Sanea, and Edward Stanley, 19th Earl of Derby. According to PR Week, 42 edits were made from the same IP address, most of them removing negative or controversial information, or adding positive information.

==== Bell Pottinger ====
In December 2011, blogger Tim Ireland, The Independent, and the British Bureau of Investigative Journalism (BIJ) discovered that Bell Pottinger, one of the UK's largest public relations companies, had manipulated articles on behalf of its clients. Wikipedians discovered up to 19 accounts, 10 of which had over 100 edits each, which traced back to Bell Pottinger's offices; as a result of the investigation 10 of the accounts were blocked. Bell Pottinger was accused of using sock or meatpuppets to edit pages to create the appearance of support for changes in articles. One of the most noted accounts was registered under the name "Biggleswiki" (an internal Wikipedia investigation resulted in several such cases). Bell Pottinger admitted that its employees had used several accounts, but said that the company had not done anything illegal. Analysis of the edits demonstrated that the changes had both added positive information and removed negative content, including the removal of information regarding the drug conviction of a businessman and Bell Pottinger client, and changing information about the arrest of a man convicted for commercial bribery.

Undercover BIJ reporters made inquiries while posing as members of the Uzbek government; Bell Pottinger told them that the company offered "sorting" of negative information and criticism on Wikipedia articles, as well as other "dark arts".

Jimmy Wales called Bell Pottinger's actions "ethical blindness." Timothy Bell, the chairman, launched an internal review, but disagreed with Wales's view. He said, "You can destroy someone's reputation in one minute and it will take years to rebuild," and continued: "It's important for Wikipedia to recognise we are a valuable source for accurate information," and "apparently if you are not-for-profit what you say is true but that if you are a paid-for advocate you are lying." The head of digital at Bell Pottinger blamed the incident on Wikipedia's "confusing" editing system and "the pressure put on us by clients to remove potentially defamatory or libellous statements very quickly, because Wikipedia is so authoritative."

In 2016, Bell Pottinger staff were reported to have edited Wikipedia articles relating to South African individuals and companies, while the agency was working for the Gupta family. Substantial editing of the Wikipedia page about the Guptas was also reported; a Bell Pottinger employee was said to have emailed much of the content to a Gupta account for it to be uploaded. In December 2016, South African billionaire Johann Rupert dropped Bell Pottinger as the PR agency of Richemont, accusing Bell Pottinger of running a social media campaign against him, to divert attention away from persistent 'state capture' allegations leveled at the Gupta family. In February 2017, Rupert alleged that Bell Pottinger had maliciously altered his Wikipedia page.

==== Portland Communications ====
In January 2012, British MP Tom Watson discovered that Portland Communications had been removing the nickname of one of its clients' products ("Wife Beater", referring to Anheuser-Busch InBev's Stella Artois beer) from Wikipedia. Other edits from Portland's offices included changes to articles about another Portland client, Kazakhstan's BTA Bank, and its former head Mukhtar Ablyazov. Portland did not deny making the changes, arguing they had been done transparently and in accordance with Wikipedia's policies. Portland Communications welcomed CIPR's subsequent announcement of a collaboration with Wikipedia and invited Jimmy Wales to speak to their company, as he did at Bell Pottinger. Tom Watson was optimistic about the collaboration: "PR professionals need clear guidelines in this new world of online-information-sharing. That's why I am delighted that interested parties are coming together to establish a clear code of conduct."

In January 2026, The Bureau of Investigative Journalism alleged that Portland Communications had continued to edit Wikipedia entries for clients since at least 2016, but used subcontractors to avoid detection. Edits included downplaying human rights violations in Qatar before the 2022 FIFA World Cup, Qatari links with terrorist group Jabhat al-Nusra, details about the Gates Foundation-funded Alliance for a Green Revolution in Africa, and information on the Libyan sovereign wealth fund. In April 2025, Portland and its parent company Omnicom were sued by migrant workers from the 2022 FIFA World Cup, accusing them of sportswashing. Portland said editing Wikipedia pages was not endorsed by Portland, was not a widespread practice, and that current staff did not engage in the activity.

==== Qatar ====
In January 2026, The Bureau of Investigative Journalism alleged that consultancy firm Portland Communications used subcontractors to edit Wikipedia entries for Qatar. In 2013 the Qatari government signed a contract with the company covering “government affairs through to nation branding”, and former Portland employees stated that Wikipedia edits were a common request. Edits included downplaying human rights violations in Qatar before the 2022 FIFA World Cup and Qatari links with terrorist group Jabhat al-Nusra.

==== Gibraltarpedia ====
In September 2012, controversy surrounded Wikimedia UK trustee Roger Bamkin, who along with OCLC Wikipedian in Residence Maximillian Klein, had been organizing an effort named Gibraltarpedia to create articles about Gibraltar in partnership with the Gibraltar Tourism Board. Articles written under this program were featured on the Wikipedia mainpage an unusually high 17 times in the course of a few weeks. This issue brought attention to organizational conflicts of interest regarding Wikimedia Movement partners, leading to an investigation of WMUK. Bamkin stepped down as trustee following the media response. Jimmy Wales commented, "It is wildly inappropriate for a board member of a chapter, or anyone else in an official role of any kind in a charity associated with Wikipedia, to take payment from customers in exchange for securing favorable placement on the front page of Wikimedia or anywhere else."

==== GEO Group ====
In February 2013, for-profit prison company GEO Group received media coverage when a Wikipedia user under the name Abraham Cohen edited the entry on the company regarding naming rights to Florida Atlantic University (FAU) Stadium. GEO Group's Manager of Corporate Relations at the time was named Abraham Cohen, who is an FAU alumnus, former FAU student body president, and former ex-officio member of the FAU board of trustees. Eleven edits constituting the majority of all those changes had been made in a single day under a Wikipedia account named "Abraham Cohen", the only day on which that account has ever been used.

==== BP ====
In March 2013, it was reported that a member of BP's press office had submitted drafts to rewrite the company's article, including sections dealing with its environmental record; the drafts were reviewed and added by other editors. Estimates of the size of the contributions were as high as 44 percent of the article. The BP press officer, who called himself "Arturo at BP," said he had chosen that name to make his affiliation clear, and noted that he had not directly edited the page. The development caused concern because the content was being produced by an employee, while "readers would be none the wiser." Jimmy Wales was quoted in Salon, saying "I think that accusing [BP employee] Arturo of 'skirting' Wikipedia's rules in this case is fairly ludicrous – unless 'skirting' means 'going above and beyond what is required in order to be very clearly in compliance with best practice.' So, I would consider that a blatant factual misrepresentation." The Wikipedia community intensely debated the ethics of the incident and how to handle it and other similar cases.

==== NGO Monitor ====
In June 2013, Arnie Draiman, online communications editor for the pro-Israel group NGO Monitor, was indefinitely banned from editing Wikipedia articles about the Arab–Israeli conflict due to biased editing, concealing his place of work, and using a second account in a way Wikipedia policy forbids. Draiman was a major contributor to the articles on NGO Monitor and its founder Gerald Steinberg, and made hundreds of inappropriate and inaccurate edits on articles about human rights organizations and other non-government organizations, including B'Tselem, the New Israel Fund, Human Rights Watch, and many others Steinberg opposes.

==== WikiExperts ====
The KMGi Group was founded by Alex Konanykhin in 1997. The advertisement company claimed that "WikiExperts employees do not directly edit Wikipedia", but "act as a consulting company which outsources such editing to most suitable affiliated experts."

==== Wiki-PR ====
In 2012, Wikipedia volunteers launched possibly one of the largest sockpuppet investigations in its history after editors on its website reported suspicious activity suggesting a number of accounts were used to subvert Wikipedia's policies. After almost a year of investigation, over 250 sockpuppet accounts were allegedly found, operated by two independent networks of users. Wikipedia editors traced the edits and sockpuppetry back to a firm known as Wiki-PR, leading to a cease and desist letter by Sue Gardner issued to the founders of the organization. The accounts were banned. On 25 October 2013, a community ban was further placed on Wiki-PR and any of its contractors.

==== Internet Research Agency ====
The 11 September 2014 Columbian Chemicals Plant explosion hoax was a "massive, coordinated, and failed hoax to create panic", planted in Wikipedia by Russian disinformation actors who were part of the Internet Research Agency, according to The New York Times Magazine.

==== Peking Duk ====
At a December 2015 Peking Duk show in Melbourne, a fan named David Spargo accessed the backstage area by editing the band's Wikipedia article page and inserting himself as a family member. Upon showing the article and his ID to the security guards, he was granted access to the band with whom he shared a beer. The band reacted positively to this scheme, with member Adam Hyde stating: "He explained to us his amazing tactic to get past security to hang with us and we immediately cracked him a beer. This dude is the definition of a legend." However, Hyde did add: "It goes to show, never trust Wikipedia".

==== Orangemoody ====
In 2015, the Wikipedia community blocked 381 accounts, many of them suspected sock puppets of the same people, after a two-month investigation called Operation Orangemoody revealed that the accounts had been used to blackmail firms "struggling to get pages about their businesses on Wikipedia." These businesses had been told by Wikipedia users that articles about them had been "rejected due to concerns of excessive promotional content." In a few cases, the users asking for money were the same accounts that had earlier rejected the articles for publication.

The scammers asked for hundreds of pounds to "protect or promote" the firms' interests. Wikipedia deleted 210 articles related to UK businesses, most of them of middle size. Individuals were also targeted. The investigation was named OrangeMoody by Wikipedia editors after the name of the first identified account. An unnamed Wikipedian stated that "undisclosed paid advocacy editing may represent a serious conflict of interest and could compromise the quality of content on Wikipedia."

==== Burger King ====
On 12 April 2017, Burger King released a commercial in which an employee states that he could not explain a Whopper in 15 seconds, after which he states "OK Google, what is the Whopper burger?" The dialogue was designed to trigger voice searches on Android devices and Google Home smart speakers configured to automatically respond to the phrase "OK Google". The specific query causes the device to read out a snippet sourced from Wikipedia's article on the Whopper. However, prior to the ad's premiere, the article had been edited by users, including one named "Burger King Corporation", so that Google's automatically generated response to the query (via the Google Knowledge Graph) would be a detailed description of the Whopper burger that utilized promotional language. The edits were reverted for violating Wikipedia's policies against blatant promotion.

Furthermore, the snippet became the target of vandals, who edited the article to claim that the sandwich contained such ingredients as "cyanide", "a medium-sized child", "rat meat" and "toenail clippings", while some users reported that Google Home had relayed information from these vandalized revisions. Soon after the release of the commercial, Google blacklisted its audio so that it would not trigger the always-on voice detection. Wikipedia also protected the Whopper article to prevent the promotional descriptions or vandalism from being re-inserted. Burger King claimed to have released a modified version of the commercial later that evening which evaded Google's block.

==== The North Face ====
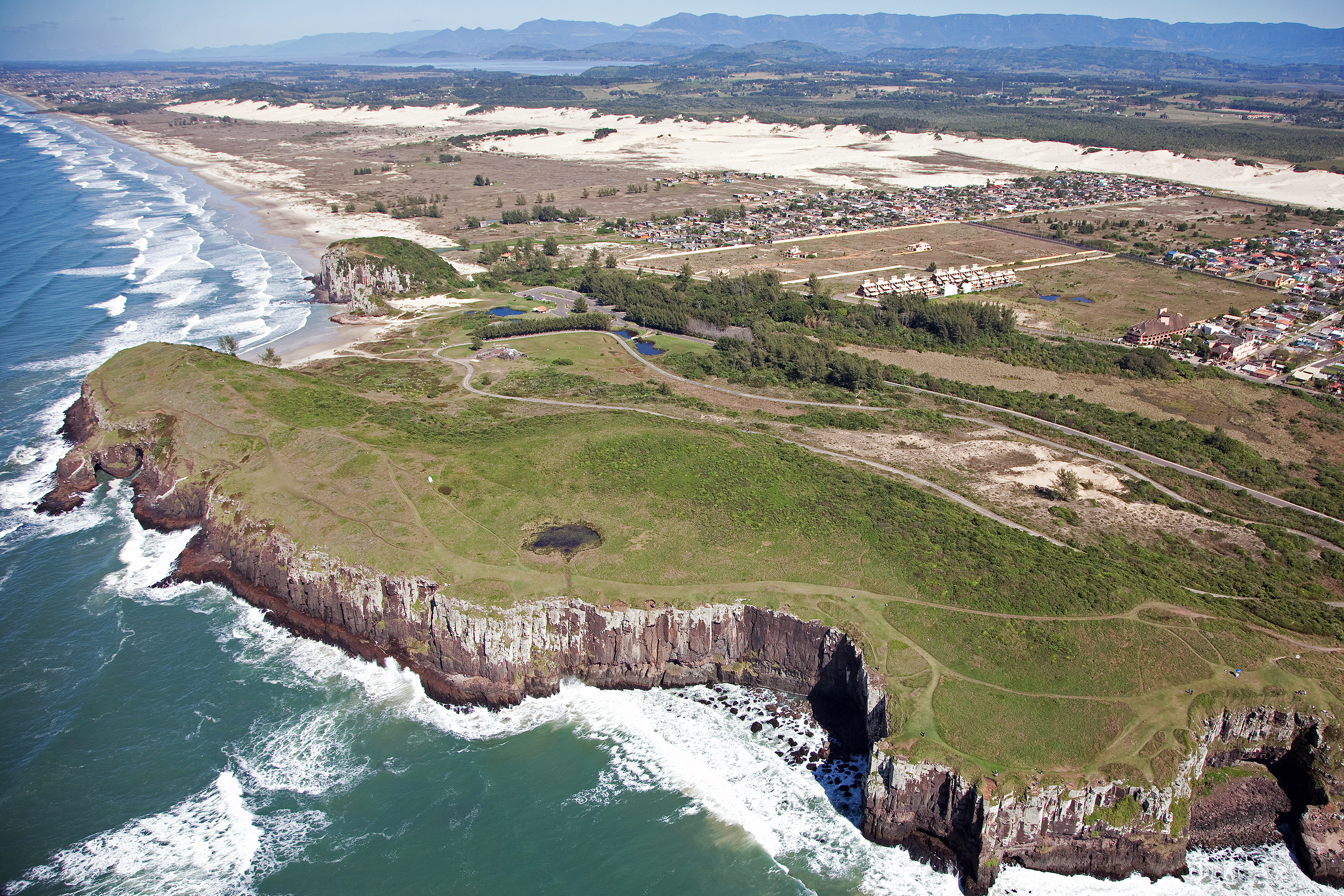
Guarita State Park was one of several articles affected by a covert advertising campaign. The article's previous main image (above) was briefly replaced by one prominently featuring a man in a North Face jacket.

In May 2019, marketing agency Leo Burnett Tailor Made revealed they had been hired by outdoor clothing company The North Face to replace images of outdoor destinations with photos containing the company's apparel, in an attempt to get its apparel to appear at the top of Google results through search engine optimization. Following media coverage, the photos were all removed from articles and some modified by Wikimedia Commons users to remove or obscure the branding. The Wikimedia Foundation condemned the stunt, stating in a press release: "When The North Face exploits the trust you have in Wikipedia to sell you more clothes, you should be angry. Adding content that is solely for commercial promotion goes directly against the policies, purpose and mission of Wikipedia".

After Wikipedia volunteers blocked the accounts involved for breaches of Wikipedia policies on paid editing, The North Face posted a response as a reply on Twitter, stating that they had ended the campaign and that "We believe deeply in Wikipedia's mission and apologize for engaging in activity inconsistent with those principles." Leo Burnett Tailor Made stated they "found a unique way to contribute photography of adventure destinations to their respective Wikipedia articles while achieving the goal of elevating those images in search rankings" and that they had "since learned that this effort worked counter to Wikipedia's community guidelines."

The campaign was described as "wildly misguided" and as having "egregiously violated just about every principle you can think about with respect to trying to maintain consumer trust" by Americus Reed, a professor of marketing at the University of Pennsylvania in an interview to The New York Times.

=== 2020s ===
==== Anti-Defamation League ====
In 2020 the Anti-Defamation League trained its staff to edit Wikipedia pages, but after conflict-of-interest criticisms from Wikipedia editors the ADL suspended the project in April 2021.

==== University of California, Board of Regents ====
In January 2025, PR administrator from University of California, Berkeley edited the University of California chancellor Rich Lyons page.

=== Miscellaneous ===
==== 2000s ====
In January 2006, a change was made to the article Princess Mabel of Orange-Nassau, removing the words "and false" from the characterization "incomplete and false" of information given by the princess regarding her relationship with slain drug lord Klaas Bruinsma. The changes were traced back to a royal palace used by the princess.

In April 2008, Phorm deleted material related to a controversy over its advertising deals.

==== 2010s ====
Edits involving Daimler AG were reported in March 2012. In August that year, the communications director for Idaho's Department of Education, Melissa McGrath, edited the article on her boss, Tom Luna. In September, there was media attention surrounding two Wikipedia employees who were running a PR business on the side and editing Wikipedia on behalf of their clients. In addition, it was revealed that Tory Party charmain Grant Shapps had changed the information about his academic record as well as donor information. Also in September, writer Philip Roth wrote a piece in The New Yorker chronicling his difficulty changing information about one of his novels.

In November 2012, Finsbury, the firm led by Roland Rudd, was found to have anonymously edited the article about Alisher Usmanov, removing information about various controversies.

In January 2014, the Wikimedia Foundation announced that Sarah Stierch was "no longer an employee of the Wikimedia Foundation", after evidence was presented on a Wikimedia mailing list that she had "been editing Wikipedia on behalf of paying clients" – a practice the Wikimedia Foundation said was "frowned upon by many in the editing community and by the Wikimedia Foundation".

In June 2014, The Wall Street Journal reported that Banc de Binary, which had been cited for unregistered options trading by US regulators, posted an advertisement on a freelancing bulletin board "offering more than $10,000 for 'crisis management'" of its Wikipedia page.

In March 2015, The Washington Post reported that The New York Police Department had confirmed that at least some edits to Wikipedia entries about people who died following confrontations with NYPD officers were made from computers on the department's servers.

In March 2019, HuffPost reported that Facebook, Axios, NBC News, and Nextdoor have paid lawyer Ed Sussman to lobby for changes to their Wikipedia articles, as well as the articles on Sheryl Sandberg, Jonathan Swan, Chuck Todd, Andy Lack, and Noah Oppenheim.

In his October 2019 book Catch and Kill, reporter Ronan Farrow reported that NBC News hired a "Wikipedia whitewasher" who removed references to NBC's role in the Weinstein case from several Wikipedia articles. NBC does not dispute the allegation.

In December 2019, The Wall Street Journal reported on paid conflict-of-interest editing by the reputation management company Status Labs regarding several of their clients, including former Bank of America executive Omeed Malik and the health technology corporation Theranos.

==== 2020s ====
In May 2020, Le Monde reported on the blocking of about 200 Wikipedia accounts related to French PR companies.

In August and September 2021, a plant-based food company called This replaced images on the Bacon article with images of their own products; the edits were quickly reverted and the account was blocked.

In November 2021, The Guardian reported on conflict-of-interest editing regarding billionaire Richard Desmond. Attempts to remove the article's description of Desmond as a "pornographer" had been going on for years. Lawyers hired by Desmond have argued for removal.

In May 2022, Haaretz reported on conflict-of-interest editing, mainly regarding Russian oligarchs.

In February 2023, The Signpost reported on conflict-of-interest editing regarding Indian billionaire industrialist Gautam Adani. The story was picked up by several Indian news-outlets.

In May 2023, Mediaite reported that American Republican presidential candidate Vivek Ramaswamy paid a Wikipedia editor to remove details from Vivek's biography that "could conceivably harm Ramaswamy's standing in a Republican primary".

In February 2024, The Scottish Sun and The National reported that a number of computers from the Scottish Parliament had been used to edit the Wikipedia articles of several MSPs from all over the political spectrum, and especially Alex Cole-Hamilton's page, in order to delete compromising details or emphasize positive aspects.

In August 2024, Portland, Oregon city commissioner and mayoral candidate Rene Gonzalez spent $6,400 of city funds to spruce up the commissioner's page. The campaign used public funds to hire a consultant, WhiteHatWiki, to advise on how to get Gonzalez's page changed. Wikipedia edit requests were submitted by commissioner's policy advisor Harrison Kass. City's auditor found the use of city funds to hire a contractor to assist with editing Wikipedia and using staff time violated campaign finance regulations.

In August 2025, one of the largest self-promotion campaigns in Wikipedia's history was uncovered, in which a network of around 200 sock puppet accounts created or edited articles in 335 languages to promote composer David Woodard. This had been active for over a decade. It was suggested that the accounts were likely to have been operated by Woodard or people close to him. Following an investigation by a user that later wrote about their findings in the English Wikipedia's newsletter, The Signpost, Wikipedia stewards and local communities deleted over 300 articles and banned associated accounts.

In September 2025, a Law.com article covered conflict-of-interest editing by law firms, including Latham & Watkins and Milbank.

In November 2025, The Verge reported on potential conflict-of-interest editing regarding Wikipedia content about Jeffrey Epstein, from 2010 and onward. Further, in early 2026, a report from The Bureau of Investigative Journalism said that Peter Mandelson’s Wikipedia page was edited repeatedly by an anonymous user who was later banned for making paid edits. The edits to Mandelson’s page downplayed his support of Epstein. The user, who claimed to be a “news junkie”, also tried to remove the fact that Mandelson was one of the UK's shortest-serving ambassadors.

== Reception ==
=== Corporate Representatives for Ethical Wikipedia Engagement ===
Phil Gomes, senior vice-president of a PR firm named Edelman Digital, created a Facebook group called "Corporate Representatives for Ethical Wikipedia Engagement" (CREWE) in January 2012.

According to Gerard F. Corbett, CEO of the Public Relations Society of America, CREWE is based on four principles: 1) corporate communicators want to do the right thing; 2) communicators engaged in ethical practice have a lot to contribute; 3) current Wikipedia policy does not fully understand numbers 1 and 2, because of the activities of some bad actors and a misunderstanding of public relations; and 4) accurate Wikipedia entries are in the public interest.

CREWE lobbies for greater involvement by PR professionals on the site, with the stated goal of maintaining accurate articles about corporations. Some Wikipedia editors, including Jimmy Wales, joined the group to discuss these issues. In an open letter to Wales, Gomes argued that Wikipedia's prominence as a top search result adds a level of responsibility to be accurate. Gomes also criticized allegedly inaccurate or outdated articles and the lack of timely response to issues raised in existing channels. He further argued that allowing PR representatives to fix minor errors such as spelling, grammar, and facts leaves too much ambiguity about what are acceptable changes to make. He made the comparison between PR editors and activists, challenging that activists seem to enjoy "much more latitude," and argued that in certain situations direct editing of articles by PR reps was called for.

=== CIPR and PRSA ===
In January 2012, the Chartered Institute of Public Relations (CIPR) in the UK began to collaborate with the regional Wikimedia UK chapter (WMUK) to provide guidance for CIPR members on how to interact with the Wikipedia community.

In January 2012, Gerard Corbett, head of the Public Relations Society of America (PRSA), said "We believe there is a case to be made for PR professionals to responsibly edit client Wikipedia entries in an ethical and transparent manner." In June, he commended CIPR for reaching a point of agreement with Wikipedia, but said "... nothing has changed at all".

=== International Association of Business Communicators ===
The International Association of Business Communicators (IABC) devoted their September 2012 CW Bulletin to paid editing on Wikipedia. PR pro Mark Estes said that: "As an advocate, a public relations professional is accountable to his or her client or organization. As a voice of social conscience, however, a public relations professional is accountable to the public at large. Thus, the innate conflict between the two identities. The theory of responsible advocacy attempts to reconcile that conflict and provide guidance to achieve common ground." PR professional David King recommended "collaborating with nothing to hide," emphasizing transparency and the importance of not editing articles directly. He explained: "When legal and marketing departments establish their corporate Wikipedia strategy or policy, they often feel they are faced with only two choices: Ignore one of the world's most influential websites with a hands-off policy or engage in the risky, controversial and ethically ambiguous practice of direct editing. In some circumstances these are both good strategies, but most companies can find more effective middle ground by engaging in PR or content marketing with Wikipedia's citizen journalists—a safe and ethical way to make improvements that is valuable both for the organization and Wikipedia."

=== WikiProject Cooperation ===
On 10 January 2012, a Wikipedian created a WikiProject, named WikiProject Cooperation. Its project page says that it "facilitates collaboration with editors paid to edit Wikipedia."

=== 2014 statement by 11 PR firms ===
In June 2014, 11 major public relations companies signed a statement agreeing to comply with Wikipedia's policies on conflict-of-interest editing.

== See also ==
- Reliability of Wikipedia
- Croatian Wikipedia § Controversies
- Criticism of Wikipedia
  - § Exposure to political operatives and advocates
  - § Commandeering or sanitizing articles
- Spin (propaganda)
- Whitewashing (censorship)
  - Wikiturfing
