= Serbo-Croatian Wikipedia =

Serbo-Croatian–language edition of Wikipedia

- Logo written in two scripts (Latin and Cyrillic)

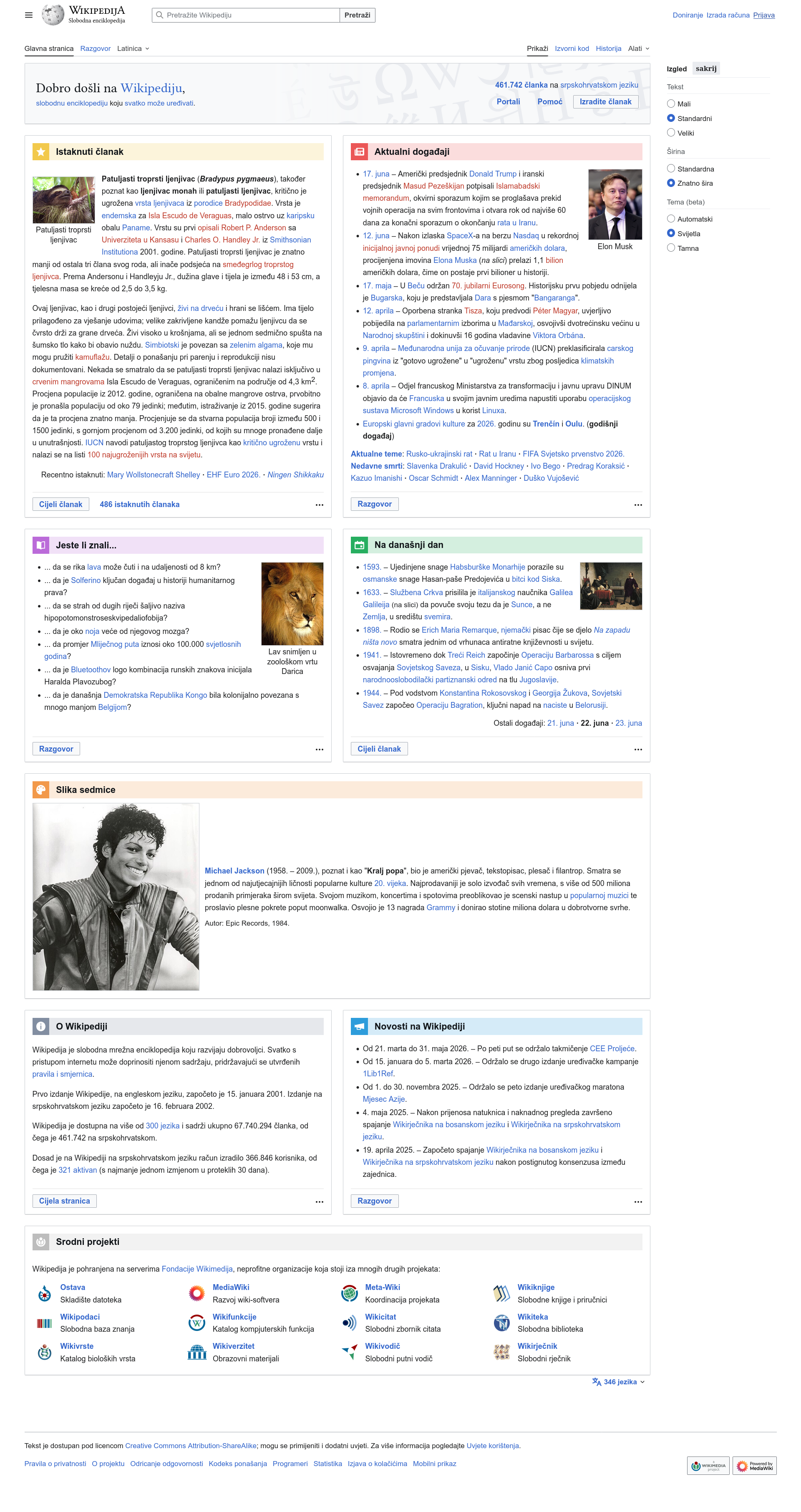
- Screenshot Main page in 2026
- Website type: Online encyclopedia
- Available in: Serbo-Croatian
- Owner: Wikimedia Foundation
- Editor: Serbo-Croatian Wikipedia community
- Website: sh.wikipedia.org
- Commercial: No
- Registration: Optional
- Users: 404,117 (as of 26 October 2026)
- Launched: 16 January 2002; 24 years ago
- Current status: Active
- Content license: Creative Commons Attribution/ Share-Alike 4.0 (most text also dual-licensed under GFDL); Media licensing varies

The Serbo-Croatian Wikipedia (Serbo-Croatian: Wikipedija na srpskohrvatskom jeziku, Википедија на српскохрватском језику) is the Serbo-Croatian language version of Wikipedia, the free encyclopedia. It was started on 16 January 2002, preceding the creation of separate Wikipedia editions for the standard varieties of the language, namely Bosnian, Croatian, and Serbian Wikipedia. Written in the Latin script, Serbo-Croatian Wikipedia provides a script converter that allows users to view pages in Cyrillic. The Serbo-Croatian Wikipedia currently has 298 active users, 8 administrators, and 461,952 articles, with a total of 42.7 million edits.

== History ==
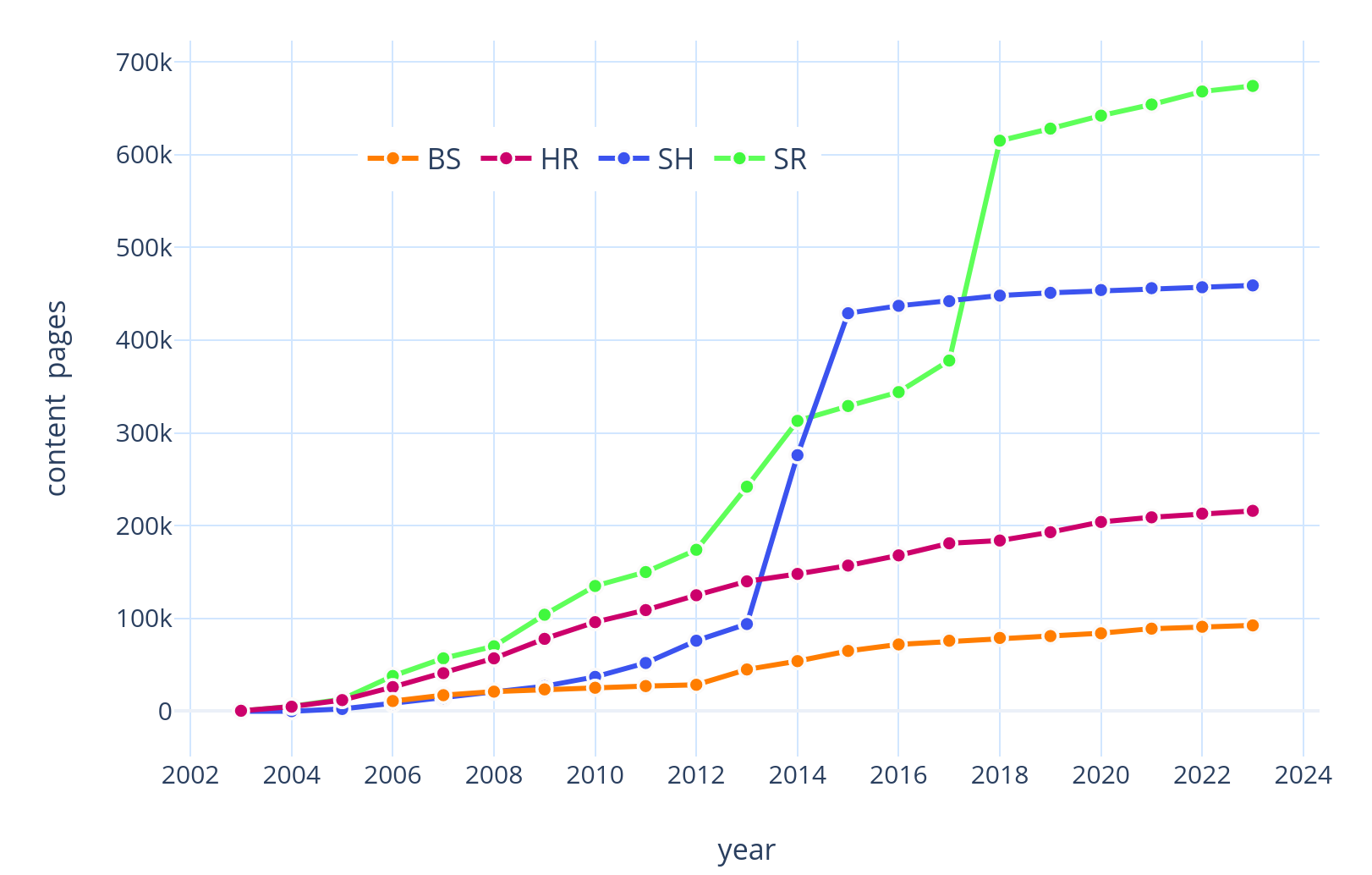
Growth comparison of Bosnian (BS), Croatian (HR), Serbo-Croatian (SH) and Serbian (SR) Wikipedias

The Serbo-Croatian Wikipedia was originally launched on 16 January 2002 at sh.wikipedia.com and moved to its current domain, sh.wikipedia.org, on 23 December 2002. On 12 December 2002, a separate Bosnian Wikipedia was founded, later incorporating articles from the original Serbo-Croatian Wikipedia. Subsequently, on 16 February 2003, separate Croatian and Serbian Wikipedias were launched. As of 2026, a Montenegrin Wikipedia does not exist; an experimental Crnogorska Enciklopedija operated between 2006 and 2008, but proposals for a Montenegrin Wikipedia have been rejected four times by the Language Committee of the Wikimedia Foundation.

The Serbo-Croatian Wikipedia was locked in February 2005 due to inactivity but was reopened in May 2005. Some users opposed its reopening, including Caesarion, who acknowledged the mutual intelligibility of Serbo-Croatian with Bosnian, Croatian, and Serbian but stated that "the wounds of the nineties Balkan wars are all too fresh to... let Serbs, Croats and Bosniaks cooperate on one Wikipedia. We must use separate Wikipedias just to keep the whole project peaceful." However, the arguments for reopening prevailed, largely due to the efforts of editors such as Pokrajac, who stated: "So, this Wikipedia (if you open it) will be absolutely NPOV, liberal and antinationalist. Many liberal and antinationalist people said that they are talking Serbo-Croatian despite Balkan war(s)."

In September 2014, the Serbo-Croatian Wikipedia had become the largest South Slavic Wikipedia edition by the number of articles. By 2017, it had become the fourth-largest Slavic-language Wikipedia, with 0.44 million articles—accounting for 7.6% of all articles in Slavic-language Wikipedias. It ranked behind the Russian (1.4 million articles), Polish (1.24 million articles), and Ukrainian (0.74 million articles) editions but ahead of the Serbian Wikipedia (0.37 million articles). As of October 2026, the Serbo-Croatian Wikipedia is the second-largest South Slavic edition and the 34th largest Wikipedia globally. A significant portion of its articles, particularly those related to geography, astronomy, and chemistry, are stubs created by Wikipedia bots between 2013 and 2015. By 2023, bots were responsible for 41% of all edits and 55% of all articles created on the project since it was set up.

== Academic studies ==
In 2015, Richard Rogers wrote that the establishment of separate Wikipedias for Bosnian, Croatian, and Serbian was a response to the "burden of collaboration after the Balkan wars". In 2023, interviewees of a qualitative comparative case study of the four BCMS-language Wikipedias found the Serbo-Croatian Wikipedia to be "the least contentious environment of the four language editions" and that its editors "were the most likely to privilege an encyclopedic identity over a national one in the process of knowledge construction," which made it a considerably less attractive target for governance capture than the Croatian and Serbian editions.

In 2020, Denny Vrandečić described the Croatian, Serbian, Bosnian, and Serbo-Croatian Wikipedias as a "natural experiment" in which contributors were divided more by politics than by linguistic differences, and wrote that the existence of the Serbo-Croatian Wikipedia "poses interesting questions" about the delineation of the languages. In 2026, Michael Falk of the University of Melbourne called Vrandečić's use of these Wikipedia editions as an example "somewhat self-defeating", arguing that Vrandečić used "language" in two senses: language defined in terms of vocabulary and syntax, and language as a social institution. Falk suggested that liberal or cosmopolitan editors would "presumably prefer" the Serbo-Croatian Wikipedia, with Serbo-Croatian symbolizing a "transnational, pan-Slavic community" for them.

== See also ==
- Comparison of Serbo-Croatian standard varieties
- Declaration on the Common Language
