= Status Labs =

Reputation management company

- Industry: Reputation management
- Founded: 2012; 14 years ago, United States
- Founder: Darius Fisher, Jordan French, Jesse Boskoff
- Headquarters: Austin, Texas, United States
- Website: statuslabs.com

Status Labs (First Page Management LLC) is a digital reputation management company based in Austin, Texas. It was founded in 2012 by Darius Fisher, Jordan French, and Jesse Boskoff. According to reporting in The Wall Street Journal, Status Labs has offered services aimed at improving clients' online reputations by promoting favorable content and reducing the visibility of negative search results.

== History ==
The clients of the reputation management company have included University of Missouri professor Melissa Click, U.S. Secretary of Education Betsy DeVos, Citadel hedge-fund manager Kenneth C. Griffin, Visium Asset Management hedge-fund manager Jacob Gottlieb, Omeed Malik, and the now-defunct healthcare technology company Theranos.

Fisher and French also founded the Wikipedia editing firm Wiki-PR two years earlier. In 2013, Wiki-PR was served a cease and desist letter and Wiki-PR and all of its employees, contractors, and owners were declared as banned from editing Wikipedia articles after an investigation by the Wikimedia Foundation discovered that around 300 sock-puppet accounts had been editing Wikipedia pages in exchange for money from clients, including Viacom and Priceline. Wikipedia eventually took down many of the pages associated with these edits. Despite the ban applying to its founders Fischer and French, Status Labs has also offered Wikipedia page editing as a service for hire.

In 2014, CNBC published a PR pitch they received from Status Labs that offered to pay journalists for mentions of their clients in news stories.

In 2015, Status Labs co-founder Jordan French resigned as chief executive officer after fallout and public outcry stemming from the February 2015 demolition of Jumpolin, a piñata shop in Austin. In October 2014, Status Labs co-founders French and Fisher bought the land on which the Jumpolin shop stood through their F&F Real Estate Ventures. The partners commissioned a demolition crew to demolish the store in their attempt to clear the lot for a SXSW-timed stage event. The tenants said French and Fisher gave them no notice of the demolition, that their inventory was still inside the building, and that they had more than two years left on their lease.

In 2017, French filed a lawsuit against his partners Fisher and Boskoff, saying they had broken their contract, defrauded him, and misappropriated funds. Fisher and Boskoff retaliated with counterclaims that French had nearly destroyed the company. The Austin Chronicle quoted French's lawyers saying, "Fisher and Boskoff are using their positions as managers of [Status Labs] to wrongfully dissipate, misapply and waste the company's assets, for their own personal unjust enrichment, and such actions are illegal, oppressive and fraudulent." In 2018, Fisher and Boskoff were held in contempt of court for violating a federal injunction; they returned $140,000 during a court recess to avoid incarceration.

On December 16, 2019, The Wall Street Journal published an article, "How the 1% Scrubs Its Image Online", profiling the effects of Status Labs' work to affect Google search results and Wikipedia articles. The Journal reported that Status Labs created fake news websites and then wrote and posted positive content about their clients on the sites. The sites, including MedicalDailyTimes.com, ChronicleWeek.com, and ChemFindIt.com, a site that once used the same IP address as Blue Land Partners, a second digital advertising agency led by Status Labs co-founders Fisher and Boskoff, were meant to mimic the look of real news sites, and were included in Google News results.

== See also ==
- Conflict-of-interest editing on Wikipedia
