= Denial of the genocide of Serbs in the Independent State of Croatia =

Denial of the genocide of Serbs in the Independent State of Croatia (NDH), a Nazi German puppet state which existed during World War II, is a historical negationist claim that no systematic mass crimes or genocide against Serbs took place in the NDH, as well as an attempt to minimize the scale and severity of genocide.

One of the strategies includes the claims that the Jasenovac concentration camp was just a labor camp, not an extermination camp. The Croatian Wikipedia has also attracted attention from international media because of bias and negationism about the crimes of the NDH.

== Background ==
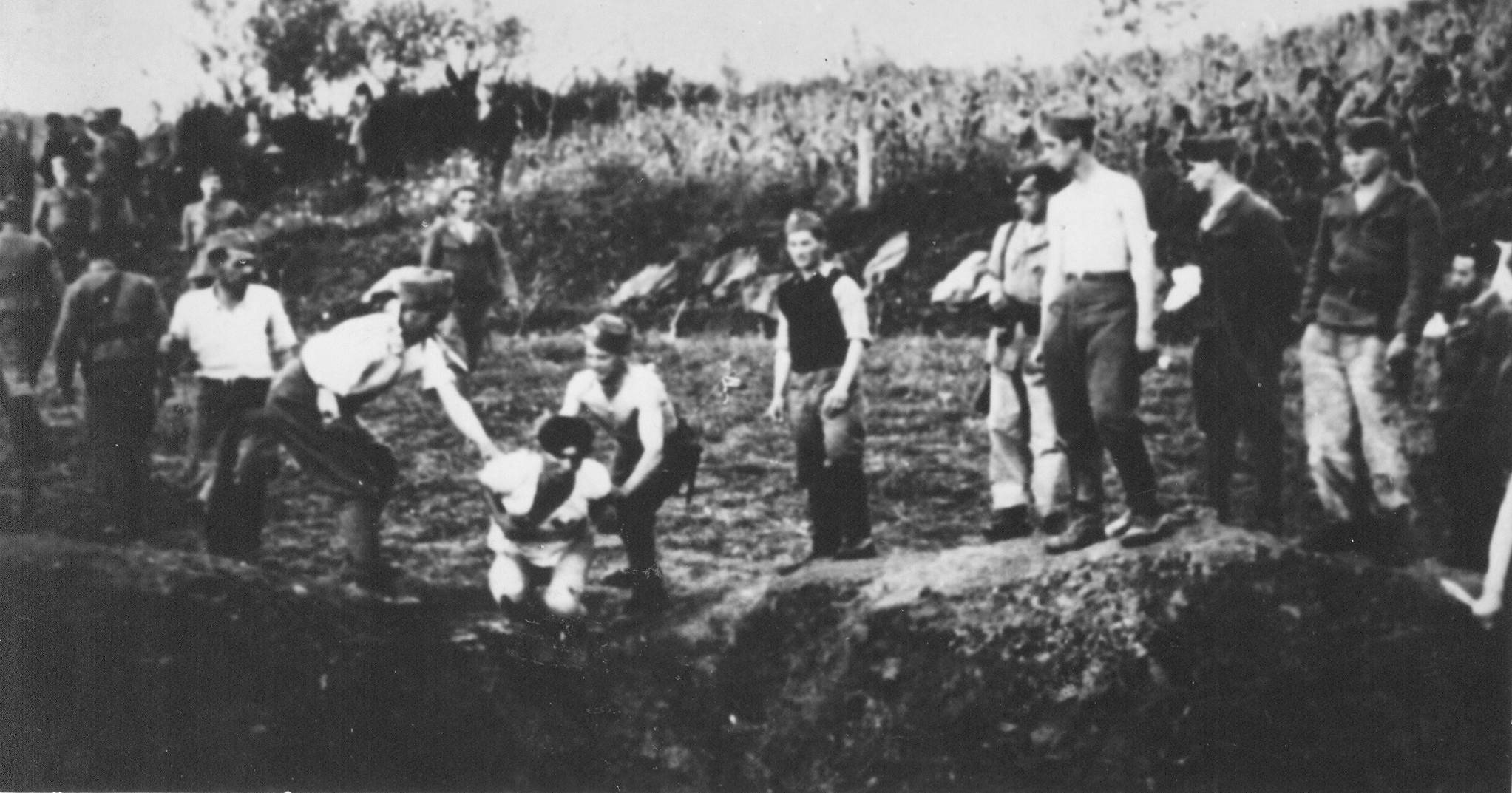
Ustaše militia execute prisoners near the Jasenovac concentration camp

Following the invasion of Yugoslavia on 6 April 1941 by Axis powers, the country was partitioned among Germany, Italy, Hungary, Bulgaria and their client regimes. German Nazi leader Adolf Hitler set up the Independent State of Croatia (NDH), a puppet state ruled by the fascist and ultranationalist Croatian Ustaše regime led by Ante Pavelić. It comprised almost all of modern-day Croatia, all of modern-day Bosnia and Herzegovina and parts of modern-day Serbia into an "Italian-German quasi-protectorate".

The Ustaše embarked on a campaign of genocide against the Serb, Jewish and Roma population within the borders of the state. Hundreds of thousands of Serbs were killed, perishing through massacres or in the state's concentration camps. The Ustaše were the only quisling forces who exercised independent authority over their concentration camps. The largest camp was the Jasenovac concentration camp, which was a complex of five subcamps, located some 100 km southeast of Zagreb. The camp was notorious for its barbaric and cruel practices of murder as described by testimonies of witnesses.

== Historiography ==
=== SFR Yugoslavia ===
The genocide of Serbs was not properly examined in the aftermath of the war, because the post-war Yugoslav government led by the Communist Party didn't encourage independent scholars out of concern that ethnic tensions stemming from the war could have the capacity to destabilize the new regime. They tried to conceal wartime atrocities and to mask specific ethnic losses. The genocide scholar Henry R. Huttenbach wrote that “an ideologized and camouflaged Titoist Yugoslav history” suppressed the genocide against Serbs, as well as that “suppression bordering of total denial”. All World War II casualties were presented as “Yugoslavs”, while all collaborationists were named as “fascists”.

=== Croatia ===
Historian Mirjana Kasapović explained that in the most important scientific works on genocide, crimes against Serbs, Jews and Roma in the NDH are unequivocally classified as genocide. She examined three main strategies of historical revisionism in the part of modern-day Croatian historiography: the NDH was a normal counter-insurgency state at the time; no mass crimes were committed in the NDH, especially genocide; the Jasenovac camp was just a labor camp, not an extermination camp. Kasapović concludes that these efforts have in practice had the opposite effect.

In a systematic analysis of over forty years of history revisionism in Serbia and Croatia (1974 to 2017), Croatian sociologist Tamara Pavasović Trošt examined how Croatian textbooks justified the existence of the NDH with an emotional narrative: the “millennial thread” of Croatian statehood had been annulled under by “the greater-Serbian regime’s attempt to destroy all signs of Croatian nationness”. Furthermore, textbooks relativize terror against Serbs by claiming that was a result of “their previous hegemony”.

Historian Hrvoje Klasić noted that since the independence of Croatia during the Breakup of Yugoslavia, a new approach to the study and teaching of Croatian history was established, which includes downplaying and denying Ustaše crimes. He stated that the trend of revisionism and negationism varied in intensity over the next twenty-five years, but was never completely stopped. Historian Rory Yeomans said in 2018 that historical revisionism in the 1990s had “its strongholds in the academy and mainstream politics” and that today's revisionists aim to rehabilitate the Ustaše regime in its entirety, comparing it to a Tuđman-era when the trend was to minimize the crimes or rehabilitate only certain aspects of it. He also noted that revisionists claim that commemorating the Ustaše crimes constitutes an attempt to “blacken the name of Croatia, declare the Croats a genocidal people and criminalize the Homeland War”.

In his review of Josip Jurčević's work, The Origin of the Jasenovac Myth, the German historian Holm Sundhaussen notes that while Jurčević is justified in his criticism of communist Yugoslavia's Jasenovac casualty numbers, he "willingly and thoughtlessly" adopts the term "Jasenovac myth" and tries to demonstrate, through the omitting of information, that Jasenovac was a "labor camp" and that genocide in the WW2 Independent State of Croatia did not occur. Jurčević also wrote that concentration camp victims dying from poor hygiene and infectious diseases.

== Far-right politics in Croatia ==
Croatia's far-right often advocates the false theory that Jasenovac was a "labour camp" where mass murder did not take place. Some rights activists say that distortion of World War II crimes exist in Croatia and it was especially prevalent during the 1990s war when anti-Serb sentiment was high. One prominent promoter of this is the far-right NGO "The Society for Research of the Threefold Jasenovac Camp". Its members include journalist Igor Vukić and academic Josip Pečarić who have written books promoting this theory. The Ideas promoted by its members have been amplified by mainstream media interviews and book tours in 2019. The last book, "The Jasenovac Lie Revealed" written by Vukić, prompted the Simon Wiesenthal Center to urge Croatian authorities to ban such works, noting that they "would immediately be banned in Germany and Austria and rightfully so". When asked if the society engaged in genocide denial, Vukić responded by saying "When it’s about genocide, it is often linked to Serbs. If it’s about that, we do deny it". Menachem Z. Rosensaft, the general counsel of the World Jewish Congress, condemned the affirmative column about Vukić's book written by Milan Ivkošić in the Večernji list, emphasizing that “there are horrific realities of history that must not be questioned, distorted or denied by anyone”.

In 2013, the Croatian Wikipedia also received attention from national and international media for promoting a fascist worldview as well as a bias against Serbs by means of historical revisionism and negating or diluting the severity of the crimes that were committed by the Ustaše regime. In one pertinent example, the Croatian page on the Jasenovac concentration camp referred to the camp as both a “collection camp” and a labor camp, and it downplayed the crimes that were committed at Jasenovac, as well as the number of victims who died there, and it also relied on right-wing media and private blogs as references. In 2021, a number of changes were made to remove administrative access from a group of editors considered responsible for this, some of whom also had their names published in Croatian media and were connected to known far-right groups.

In 2016, Croatian filmmaker Jakov Sedlar released a documentary Jasenovac – The Truth which advocated the same theories, labeling the camp as a "collection and labour camp". The film contained alleged falsifications and forgeries, in addition to denial of crimes and hate speech towards politicians and journalists. The film was criticized for the lack of depth to provide the truth related to the causes to help others understand the events leading up to the structured horror of Jasenovac. A report covered that the camp was the single largest concentration camp in the Yugoslav region at the time of the Second World War that was not established by the Nazis themselves.

== Political scandals ==
Some Croats, including politicians, have attempted to minimise the magnitude of the genocide perpetrated against Serbs in the Independent State of Croatia.

By 1989, the future President of Croatia, Franjo Tuđman had embraced Croatian nationalism, and published Horrors of War: Historical Reality and Philosophy, in which he questioned the official number of victims killed by the Ustaše during the Second World War. In this book, Tuđman claimed that between 30,000 and 40,000 died at Jasenovac. Although the victim numbers vary, the Jasenovac Memorial lists 83,145, over half of which reported as Serbs. Some scholars and observers accused Tuđman of "flirting with ideas associated with the Ustaše movement" and downplaying the number of victims in the Independent State of Croatia.

Nonetheless, in his 1996 book, Tuđman did confirm that genocide happened:

It is a historical fact that the Ustaše regime of NDH, in its implementation of the plan to reduce the 'hostile Serb Orthodox people in Croatian lands', committed a large genocidal crime over the Serbs, and proportionately even higher over the Roma and Jews, in the implementation of Nazi racial politics.

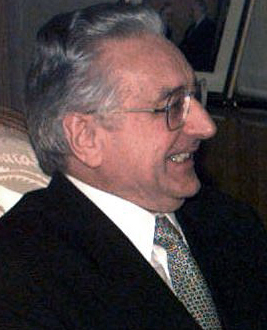
Franjo Tuđman, who was the first President of Croatia, sparked controversy over "flirting with the Ustaše ideas" and downplaying the number of victims in the NDH

Croatian politician Stipe Mesić, who had previously served as the Prime Minister of Croatia, made public statements in 1992 about how there should be "no apologies" for Jasenovac, how it wasn't a "death camp", denying the nature of the concentration camp, and other statements considered supportive of the Ustaše; the videos of which were published in 2006 and 2017. Mesić, who had in the meantime become the President of Croatia, and was a well-known supporter of the Partisans, apologized and renounced these statements. Mesić further apologized for "the imprudent statement" and relativization of the crimes in Jasenovac in 2017.

On 17 April 2011, in a commemoration ceremony, Croatian President Ivo Josipović warned that there were "attempts to drastically reduce or decrease the number of Jasenovac victims", adding, "faced with the devastating truth here that certain members of the Croatian people were capable of committing the cruelest of crimes."

Croatian historian and politician Zlatko Hasanbegović, who previously served as the country's Minister of Culture in 2016, has been accused of downplaying the crimes of the Ustaše and trying to rehabilitate their ideas in his work. In 1996, Hasanbegović wrote at least two articles in the magazine "The Independent State of Croatia", edited by the small far-right Croatian Liberation Movement party (HOP), in which he glorified the Ustaše as heroes and martyrs and denied crimes committed by the regime. In response, Hasanbegović denied being an apologist for the regime, stating that Ustaša crimes during the Second World War were "the biggest moral lapse" of the Croatian people in their history and that his words were taken out of context for political manipulation.

Since 2016, anti-fascist groups, leaders of Croatia's Serb, Roma and Jewish communities and former top Croat officials have boycotted the official state commemoration for the victims of the Jasenovac concentration camp because of their view that Croatian authorities tolerate the promotion of Ustaše legacy and refuse to act against revisionist denials, downplaying and relativizing crimes committed by Ustaše.

== See also ==
- Holocaust denial

== Sources ==
=== Books ===
- Sindbaek, Tia (2012). Usable History?: Representations of Yugoslavia's Difficult Past from 1945 to 2002. ISD LLC. ISBN 978-8-77124-107-5.
- Ciment, James; Hill, Kenneth (2012). Political Violence in Twentieth-Century Europe. Routledge. ISBN 9781136596216.
- Bürgschwentner, Joachim; Egger, Matthias; Barth-Scalmani, Gunda (2014). Other Fronts, Other Wars?: First World War Studies on the Eve of the Centennial. Brill. ISBN 978-90-04-24365-1.
- Horvitz, Leslie Alan; Catherwood, Christopher (2014). Encyclopedia of War Crimes and Genocide. Infobase Publishing. ISBN 9781438110295.
- Parenti, Michael (2002). To Kill a Nation: The Attack on Yugoslavia. Verso Books. ISBN 9781859843666.
- Ramet, Sabrina (2007). Democratic Transition in Croatia: Value Transformation, Education, and Media. Texas A&M University Press. ISBN 9781603444521.
- Tomasevich, Jozo (2001). War and Revolution in Yugoslavia, 1941–1945: Occupation and Collaboration. Stanford: Stanford University Press. ISBN 978-0-8047-7924-1.
- Walasek, Helen (2016). Bosnia and the Destruction of Cultural Heritage. Routledge. ISBN 9781317172994.
- Mojzes, Paul (2011). Balkan Genocides: Holocaust and Ethnic Cleansing in the 20th Century. Lanham: Rowman & Littlefield. ISBN 9781442206632.
- Huttenbach, Henry R. (2016). "Genocide Denial". In Chorbajian, Levon; Shirinian, George (eds.). Studies in Comparative Genocide. Springer. ISBN 9781349273485.

=== Journals ===
- Sadkovich, James (2010). "Forging Consensus: How Franjo Tuđman Became an Authoritarian Nationalist". Review of Croatian History. 6 (1): 7–35.
- Kasapović, Mirjana (2018). "Genocid u NDH: Umanjivanje, banaliziranje i poricanje zločina". Politička Misao: Časopis za Politologiju. 55 (1): 7–33. doi:10.20901/pm.55.1.01.
- Pavasović Trošt, Tamara (2018). "Ruptures and continuities in nationhood narratives: reconstructing the nation through history textbooks in Serbia and Croatia". Nations and Nationalism. 24 (3): 716–740. doi:10.1111/nana.12433. S2CID 242057219.
- Radonic, Ljiljana (2013). "Croatia's Politics of the Past during the Tuđman Era (1990–1999)—Old Wine in New Bottles?". Totalitarian Movements and Political Religions. 44: 234–254. doi:10.1017/S0067237813000143. S2CID 145718988.
- Odak, Stipe; Benčić, Andriana (2016). "Jasenovac — A Past That Does Not Pass: The Presence of Jasenovac in Croatian and Serbian Collective Memory of Conflict". East European Politics and Societies and Cultures. 30 (4): 805–829. doi:10.1177/0888325416653657. S2CID 148091289.
- McCormick, Rob (2008). "The United States' Response to Genocide in the Independent State of Croatia, 1941–1945". Genocide Studies and Prevention. 3 (1): 75–98. doi:10.1353/gsp.2011.0060. S2CID 145309437.
- Klasić, Hrvoje (2016). "Dealing with or facing the past?". Europski glasnik - le Messager européen (4): 229–232.
