= Operation Orangemoody =

Wikipedia investigation of paid editing ring

On August 31, 2015, the English Wikipedia community discovered 381 sockpuppet accounts operating an undisclosed paid editing ring. Participants in the ring extorted money from mid-sized businesses who had articles about themselves rejected by the encyclopedia's "Articles for Creation" process, in which drafts are submitted for approval to experienced editors. The ring was nicknamed "Operation Orangemoody" after the first account uncovered in the sockpuppet investigation, and was Wikipedia's biggest conflict-of-interest scandal as of June 2021, exceeding the scope of the Wiki-PR Wikipedia editing scandal in which approximately 250 sockpuppets were found and blocked in 2013.

The story was reported by many English-language and non–English-language news sources, including Komsomolskaya Pravda, Le Temps, Le Monde and Die Zeit. The editing was described by various media as the work of "black hat" editors, "extortion" a "blackmail scam", and an "international extortion scandal".

== History ==
In 2015, administrators of the English Wikipedia blocked 381 accounts, many of them suspected of being sockpuppets of the same group of people, after a two-month investigation launched by Wikipedia editors. More than 200 Wikipedia articles created from the accounts were deleted.

Wikipedia's resulting investigation found that sockpuppets had searched the site for deleted or rejected articles about businesses and individuals. Many of the articles had been deleted because of excessive promotional content. The editors, some posing as Wikipedia administrators, would then extort payment from the businesses to publish and protect the articles. Besides businesses, individuals were targeted, including the Cuban musician Dayramir González. The scammers themselves may have been involved in the deletion of some articles.

== See also ==
- List of Wikipedia controversies
- Vandalism on Wikipedia
