= 1Lib1Ref =

Campaign for library engagement with Wikipedia

#1Lib1Ref
- Status: Active
- Frequency: Annual
- Location: Online
- Inaugurated: 15 January 2016 – 23 January 2016
- Previous event: 15 January 2025 – 5 February 2025
- Organizer: Wikipedia:GLAM
- Website: 1lib1ref.org

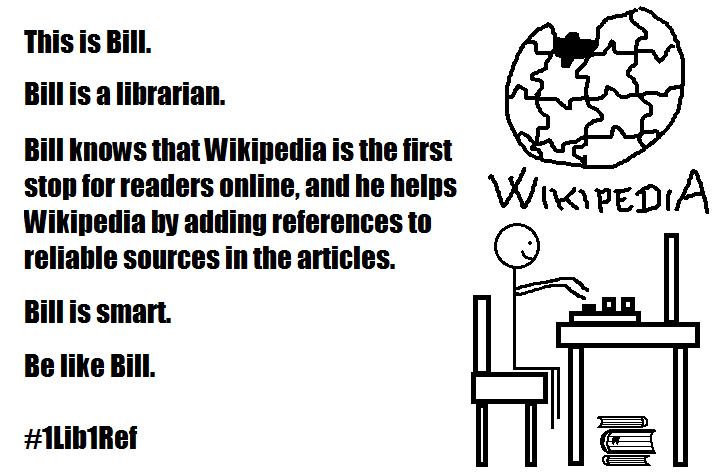
A Be like Bill meme relating to the campaign

#1Lib1Ref (known in some Romance languages as #1Bib1Ref) is a Wikipedia campaign inviting librarians to participate in the online encyclopedia project, specifically improving articles by adding citations.

The first #1Lib1Ref campaign coincided with the 15th anniversary of the founding of Wikipedia in January 2016. Based on the premise of One Librarian, One Reference, organizers estimated that if each librarian on the planet spent 15 minutes adding a citation, the combined effort would eliminate English Wikipedia's backlog of 350,000 "[]" notices. The inaugural, weeklong event ran from 15–23 January 2016, and employed the hashtag #1lib1ref on various social media platforms.

== Results of the first campaign ==
The inaugural campaign ended with 1,232 revisions on 879 pages, by 327 users in 9 languages, using the hashtag #1lib1ref in the edit summary; these numbers likely underestimate the overall impact, since many participants were observed omitting the hashtag from edit summaries. On Twitter the #1lib1ref hashtag was used in over 1,100 posts by over 630 users.

== Recurring event ==
The campaign has been revived as an annual celebration of Wikipedia's birthday, expanding into a three-week event in subsequent years. The 1Lib1Ref campaign is part of the Wikimedia Foundation's GLAM outreach strategy to involve librarians in the improvement of Wikipedia, and other Wikimedia projects (as of 2022 plans).
