= Dayramir González =

- Born: Dayramir González Vicet; Havana, Cuba
- Genres: Afro-Cuban jazz, jazz, contemporary Cuban
- Occupations: Musician, composer, arranger, producer
- Instrument: Piano
- Label: Colibrí
- Website: dayramirgonzalez.com

Dayramir González Vicet is a Cuban pianist, composer, arranger, and producer.

In 2004 he formed his own project Dayramir & Habana enTRANCe, which has performed internationally since its inception.

While still attending Berklee College of Music, in 2012, he was selected by Chucho Valdés, a mentor to González, to be part of Carnegie Hall's Voices of Latin America series, where he represented, along with Aldo López-Gavilán the young generation of Afro-Cuban jazz pianists. According to his website, he now lives in the South Bronx.

== Orangemoody investigation ==
In August 2015, a Wikipedia investigation codenamed Orangemoody revealed a network of paid editors and blackmailers operating on the English Wikipedia. A total of 381 accounts were implicated in creating promotional content for payment, with some attempting to extort fees from subjects, including González, to alter or protect their articles. The activity violated Wikipedia’s conflict-of-interest and neutrality policies, leading to the banning of hundreds of accounts by volunteer editors and the Wikimedia Foundation.

== Awards and recognition ==
Featured in the award-winning book Danzón: Circum-Caribbean Dialogues in Music and Dance, he is considered a main proponent of continuing the tradition of Cuban music as he combines "formal elements of standard jazz practice...with elements of the danzón." He is among the few Cuban jazz artists rescuing the danzón and "reinventing the genre on the basis of diverse constructions of identity."

== Discography ==
- 2007: Dayramir & Habana enTRANCe (Colibrí Productions)
- 2008: Solo tú y yo - Giraldo Piloto & Klimax (EGREM)
- 2009: Todo Está Bien - Giraldo Piloto & Klimax (Bis Music)
- 2011: Octave (Jazz Revelation Records)
- 2018: The Grand Concourse (Machat Records)
