= Sock puppet account =

False online identity used for deception

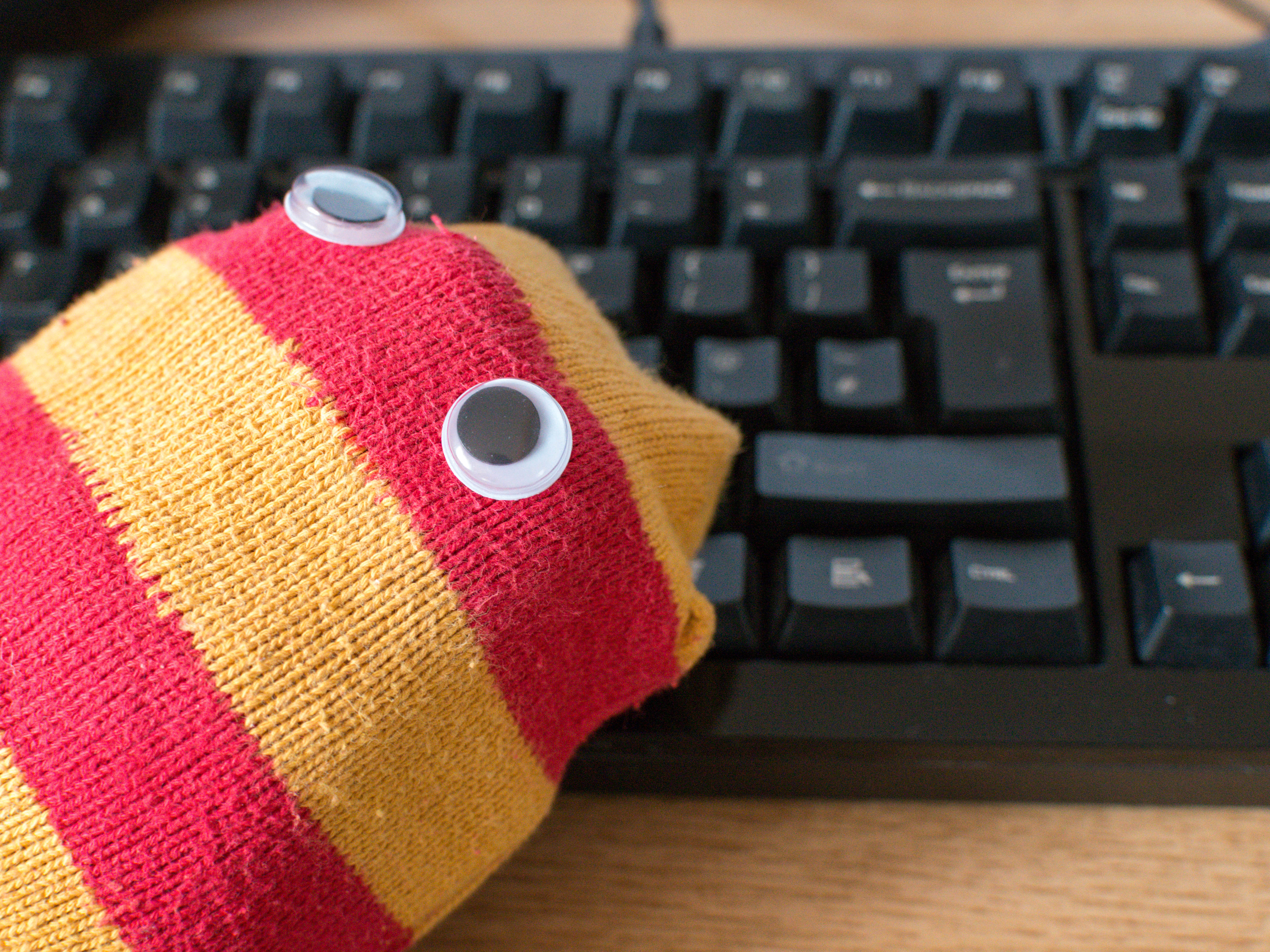
A sock puppet imposed on a keyboard

A sock puppet, sock puppet account, or sock is a false online identity used for deceptive purposes. The term metaphorically refers to a hand puppet made from a sock. Sock puppets might be created by people and organizations to praise, defend, or support themselves, to manipulate public opinion, or to circumvent restrictions such as accessing a resource that a user is blocked from. Sock puppets are unwelcome in many online communities and forums.

Generally, a sock puppet dishonestly pretends to be independent from a primary user account, in order to mislead. In contrast, a legitimate pseudonym is sometimes termed an "alt" (short for "alternate" or "alternative") identity or account.

== History ==
The practice of writing pseudonymous self-reviews began before the Internet. Writers Walt Whitman and Anthony Burgess wrote pseudonymous reviews of their own books, as did Benjamin Franklin.

The Oxford English Dictionary defines the term without reference to the internet, as "a person whose actions are controlled by another; a minion" with a 2000 citation from U.S. News & World Report.

Wikipedia has had a long history of problems with sockpuppetry. On October 21, 2013, the Wikimedia Foundation (WMF) condemned paid advocacy sockpuppeting on Wikipedia and, two days later on October 23, specifically banned Wiki-PR editing of Wikipedia. In August and September 2015, the WMF uncovered another group of sockpuppets belonging to Orangemoody, a collective for undisclosed paid editing.

== Types ==
=== Block evasion ===
One reason for sockpuppeting is to circumvent a block, ban, or other form of sanction imposed on the person's original account.

=== Ballot stuffing ===
Sockpuppets may be created during an online poll to increase the puppeteer's votes. A related usage is the creation of multiple identities, each supporting the puppeteer's views in an argument, attempting to position the puppeteer as representing majority opinion and sideline opposition voices. In the abstract theory of social networks and reputation systems, this is known as a Sybil attack.

A sockpuppet-like use of deceptive fake identities is used in stealth marketing. The stealth marketer creates one or more pseudonymous accounts, each claiming to be a different enthusiastic supporter of the sponsor's product, book or ideology.

This type of sockpuppets can also be used on review aggregator website like Metacritic and Rotten Tomatoes by creating multiple fake accounts to engage in review bombing.

=== Strawman sockpuppet ===
A strawman sockpuppet (sometimes abbreviated as strawpuppet) is a false flag pseudonym created to make a particular point of view look foolish or unwholesome in order to generate negative sentiment against it. Strawman sockpuppets typically behave in an unintelligent, uninformed, or bigoted manner, advancing "straw man" arguments that their puppeteers can easily refute. The intended effect is to discredit more rational arguments made for the same position.

Such sockpuppets behave in a similar manner to Internet trolls. A particular case is the concern troll, a false flag pseudonym created by a user whose actual point of view is opposed to that of the sockpuppet. The concern troll posts in web forums devoted to its declared point of view and attempts to sway the group's actions or opinions while claiming to share their goals, but with professed "concerns". The goal is to sow fear, uncertainty and doubt (FUD) within the group.

=== Meatpuppet ===
Some sources have used the term meatpuppet as a synonym for sock puppet, though meatpuppet is more commonly accepted to be an account that is run by a person other than the puppeteer, yet used to accomplish the same goals as a typical sock puppet.

== Investigation of sockpuppetry ==
A number of techniques have been developed to determine whether accounts are sockpuppets, including comparing the IP addresses of suspected sockpuppets and comparative analysis of the writing style of suspected sockpuppets. Using GeoIP it is possible to look up the IP addresses and locate them.

== Legal implications of sockpuppetry in the United States ==
=== United States v. Drew ===
In 2006, Missouri resident Lori Drew created a MySpace account purporting to be operated by a fictitious 16-year-old boy named Josh Evans. He began an online relationship with Megan Meier, a 13-year-old girl who had allegedly been in conflict with Drew's daughter. After "Josh Evans" ended their relationship, Meier later committed suicide.

In 2008, Thomas O'Brien, United States Attorney for the Central District of California, charged Drew, then 49, with four felony counts: one count of conspiracy to violate the Computer Fraud and Abuse Act (CFAA), which prohibits "accessing a computer without authorization via interstate commerce", and three counts of violation of the CFAA, alleging she violated MySpace's terms of service by misrepresenting herself. O'Brien justified his prosecution of the case because MySpace's servers were located in his jurisdiction. The jury convicted Drew of three misdemeanor counts, dismissing one on the grounds prosecutors had failed to demonstrate Drew inflicted emotional distress on Meier.

During sentencing arguments, prosecutors argued for the maximum sentence for the statute: three years in prison and a fine of $300,000. Drew's lawyers argued her use of a false identity did not constitute unauthorized access to MySpace, citing People v. Donell, a 1973 breach of contract dispute, in which a court of appeals ruled "fraudulently induced consent is consent nonetheless." Judge George H. Wu dismissed the charges before sentencing.

=== People v. Golb ===
In 2010, 50-year-old lawyer Raphael Golb was convicted on 30 criminal charges, including identity theft, criminal impersonation, and aggravated harassment, for using multiple sockpuppet accounts to attack and impersonate historians he perceived as rivals of his father, Norman Golb. Golb defended his actions as "satirical hoaxes" protected by free-speech rights. He was disbarred and sentenced to six months in prison, but the sentence was reduced to probation on appeal.

=== New Directions for Young Adults, Inc. v. Davis ===
In 2014, a Florida state circuit court held that sock puppetry is tortious interference with business relations and awarded injunctive relief against it during the pendency of litigation. The court found that "the act of falsifying multiple identities" is conduct that should be enjoined. It explained that the conduct was wrongful "not because the statements are false or true, but because the conduct of making up names of persons who do not exist to post fake comments by fake people to support Defendants' position tortiously interferes with Plaintiffs' business" and such "conduct is inherently unfair".

The court, therefore, ordered the defendants to "remove or cause to be removed all postings creating the false impression that more [than one] person are commenting on the program th[an] actually exist". The court also found, however, that the comments of the defendants "which do not create a false impression of fake patients or fake employees, or fake persons connected to program (those posted under their respective names) are protected by The Constitution of the United States of America, First Amendment".

== Examples of sockpuppetry ==
=== Business promotion ===
In 2007, the CEO of Whole Foods, John Mackey, was discovered to have posted as "Rahodeb" on the Yahoo! Finance Message Board, extolling his own company and predicting a dire future for its rival, Wild Oats Markets, while concealing his relationship to both companies. Whole Foods argued that none of Mackey's actions broke the law.

During the 2007 trial of Conrad Black, chief executive of Hollinger International, prosecutors alleged that he had posted messages on a Yahoo! Finance chat room using the name "nspector", attacking short sellers and blaming them for his company's stock performance. Prosecutors provided evidence of these postings in Black's criminal trial, where he was convicted of mail fraud and obstruction. The postings were raised at multiple points in the trial.

=== Book and film reviews ===
An amazon.com computer glitch in 2004 revealed the names of many authors who had written pseudonymous reviews of their books. John Rechy, who wrote the best-selling novel City of Night (1963), was among the authors unmasked in this way, and was shown to have written numerous five-star reviews of his own work. In 2010, historian Orlando Figes was found to have written Amazon reviews under the names "orlando-birkbeck" and "historian", praising his own books and criticizing those of historians Rachel Polonsky and Robert Service. The two sued Figes and won monetary damages.

During a panel discussion at a British Crime Writers Festival in 2012, author Stephen Leather admitted using pseudonyms to praise his own books, claiming that "everyone does it". He spoke of building a "network of characters", some operated by his friends, who discussed his books and had conversations with him directly. The same year, after he was pressured by the spy novelist Jeremy Duns on Twitter, who had detected possible indications online, UK crime fiction writer R.J. Ellory admitted having used a pseudonymous account name to write a positive review for each of his own novels, and additionally a negative review for two other authors.

David Manning was a fictitious film critic, created by a marketing executive working for Sony Corporation to give consistently good reviews for releases from Sony subsidiary Columbia Pictures, which could then be quoted in promotional material.

=== Blog commentary ===
American reporter Michael Hiltzik was temporarily suspended from posting to his blog, "The Golden State", on the Los Angeles Times website after he admitted "posting there, as well as on other sites, under false names." He used the pseudonyms to attack conservatives such as Hugh Hewitt and L.A. prosecutor Patrick Frey—who eventually exposed him. Hiltzik's blog at the LA Times was the newspaper's first blog. While suspended from blogging, Hiltzik continued to write regularly for the newspaper.

Lee Siegel, a writer for The New Republic magazine, was suspended for defending his articles and blog comments under the username "Sprezzatura". In one such comment, "Sprezzatura" defended Siegel's essay on Jon Stewart: "Siegel is brave, brilliant and wittier than Stewart will ever be."

=== Government sockpuppetry ===
As an example of state-sponsored Internet sockpuppetry, in 2011, a US company called Ntrepid was awarded a $2.76 million contract from U.S. Central Command for "online persona management" operations to create "fake online personas to influence net conversations and spread U.S. propaganda" in Arabic, Persian, Urdu and Pashto as part of Operation Earnest Voice.

On September 11, 2014, a number of sockpuppet accounts reported an explosion at a chemical plant in Louisiana. The reports came on a range of media, including Twitter and YouTube, but U.S. authorities claimed the entire event to be a hoax. The information was determined by many to have originated with a Russian government-sponsored sockpuppet management office in Saint Petersburg, called the Internet Research Agency. Russia was again implicated by the U.S. intelligence community in 2016 for hiring trolls in the 2016 United States presidential election.

The Institute of Economic Affairs claimed in a 2012 paper that the United Kingdom government and the European Union fund charities that campaign and lobby for causes the government supports. In one example, 73% of responses to a government consultation were the direct result of campaigns by alleged "sockpuppet" organizations.

== See also ==
- Catfishing
- Conflict-of-interest editing on Wikipedia
- On the Internet, nobody knows you're a dog
- Passing (sociology)
- Phishing
- Reputation
- Review bomb
- Shill
- Team Jorge
- Trojan Horse
- Twinking/smurfing (video games)
