= Visium Asset Management =

Former American hedge fund

Visium Asset Management LP
- Type: Private
- Industry: Investment management
- Founded: 2005
- Founder: Jacob Gottlieb
- Defunct: 2016
- Fate: Liquidation
- Headquarters: New York City, New York, U.S.
- Products: Hedge funds
- AUM: $8 billion (2016)
- Number of employees: 170 (2016)

Visium Asset Management LP was an American multi-strategy hedge fund and private equity firm. It began as a healthcare-focused fund, founded in 2005 by Jacob Gottlieb. In 2016, three of the company's traders were indicted by United States federal authorities for securities fraud. One of the accused employees killed himself days after he was indicted. Visium subsequently liquidated several of its funds and wound down operations.

== Business ==
Visium Asset Management oversaw numerous funds throughout its existence. In 2015, Visium "managed five hedge funds and a mutual fund" while also reportedly trying to raise $500 million in capital for the creation of a private equity fund, according to Bloomberg News. At the company's most successful point in 2016, they had at least $8 billion in assets under management.

Name	Start	End	Fate	Notes	Ref.
Visium Balanced Fund	2005	2016	Liquidated (Note: 3–5% of the fund was held back for potential payment of the firm's liabilities.)	The firm's flagship healthcare equity fund. It would later serve as a model for Altium Capital.	
Visium Global Fund	2009	2016	Sold	Bought by AllianceBernstein.	
Visium Institutional Partners Fund	2010	2016	Liquidated	Large-cap healthcare equity fund.	
Visium Equity Alpha Fund	2011	2016	Liquidated	A diversified United States-focused equity fund with long and short positions.	
Visium Equity Alpha UCITS Fund	2015	2016	Liquidated	A diversified United States-focused equity fund with long and short positions.	
Visium Credit Opportunities Fund	2009	2013	Liquidated	Investigated in March 2016 over valuation of securities.	
Visium Event Driven Fund	2013	2015	Liquidated	An equity fund with long and short positions focused on Event-Driven investing.	

Visium Asset Management started as a family business. Until 2010, Gottlieb's father had a desk within the firm's New York office and, on occasion, informally advised the company on accounting matters. Jacob Gottlieb's brother Mark worked at Visium in various roles, in a move regarded by Bloomberg News as a "potential conflict of interest". Additionally, Bloomberg reported that portfolio manager Stefan Lumiere "was hired in 2007, two years after his sister Alexandra became engaged to [Jacob] Gottlieb."

Despite his public commitment to "the highest ethical conduct [for Visium employees]", Gottlieb directly owned 25,703 pre-IPO shares of Intercept Pharmaceuticals despite the company having 5.2% stake as well. This caused at least one investor complaint, and the company received accusations of double standards from several employees.

== Winding down and closure ==
=== Investigation for fraud ===
A former trader with the firm, Jason Thorell, told the U.S. Securities and Exchange Commission in 2013, according to Reuters, that "Visium employees routinely sought sham quotes from brokers to justify inflated values for debt securities, and deviated from prices set by third-parties on a magnitude beyond what was usual." Thorell would cooperate with federal investigators who asked him to secretly record individuals at the firm including Gottlieb's brother-in-law Lumiere. He cooperated with federal investigators and secretly recorded over 200 hours of conversations with individuals at the firm over two years.

In March 2016, Visium notified shareholders that Visium was being investigated by the United States Department of Justice and the U.S. Securities and Exchange Commission regarding the company's actions in regard to their Credit Opportunities Fund which had been shut down in 2013. The investigation led to large customer withdrawals. Later in June, three traders at the firm were charged with securities fraud. Sanjay Valvani and Chris Plaford were indicted for insider trading while Plaford and Stefan Lumiere were accused of inflating the value of the Credit Opportunities Fund.

The Securities and Exchange Commission barred former portfolio manager, Christopher Plaford, from the securities industry after charges that he inflated asset prices under a fraudulent scheme at Visium Asset Management. In 2016, Plaford pleaded guilty to securities fraud and was permanently banned from the securities industry.

Separately, Plaford's cooperation with the government led to a jury conviction of a research consultant, David Blaszczak, the founder of Precipio Health Strategies, for violating insider-trading rules by obtaining and relaying nonpublic information from the Centers for Medicare and Medicaid Services about coming changes in health-care policy to Deerfield Management. The jury also convicted the government employee who leaked the tips as well as a pair of Deerfield Management employees who made trades based on the information.

Later, Steven Ku, Visium's former Chief Financial Officer, agreed to be barred from the securities industry for one year and pay $100,000 to settle the agency's allegations that he failed to supervise portfolio managers Christopher Plaford and Stefan Lumiere.

=== United States v. Valvani; suicide ===
In 2016, portfolio manager Sanjay Valvani and two others were charged with insider trading by federal prosecutor Preet Bharara, the United States Attorney for the Southern District of New York. While managing the firm's flagship healthcare fund, according to federal authorities, "Valvani specifically made about $25 million by trading on non-public information about pending drug approvals from the Food and Drug Administration". (Note: Bloomberg News reported a $32 million figure from federal authorities.) Valvani had worked for the company since its inception in 2005, and reportedly managed as much as $2 billion in funds.

Valvani turned himself in to authorities on June 15, 2016, and was arrested. He pled not guilty to five counts. He was freed on bail in the amount of $5 million, secured by his home. If convicted, Valvani would have faced up to 85 years in prison.

Valvani's two alleged co-conspirators pled guilty, however. The two admitted their participation with Valvani in the illegal scheme, and agreed to cooperate in the case against Valvani.

On June 20, 2016, five days after he was indicted, Valvani was found dead in an apparent suicide. Due to his death, the government's court case against him had to be dropped.

In 2019, Visium filed a complaint against Sanjay Valvani's widow and estate seeking over $100 million be returned, (Note: The company specifically requested a return of payments it previously made to Valvani between 2007 and 2016; he had been paid more than $30 million in a single year.) due to Valvani's alleged illegal conduct and breach of fiduciary duty. In 2020, the suit was dismissed by the New York Supreme Court citing the expiration of the statute of limitations.

=== United States v. Lumiere ===
Two years after his sister's 2005 marriage to Gottlieb, Stefan Lumiere joined Visium, ultimately working under Chris Plaford in the firm's Credit Opportunities Fund which held assets consisting of distressed debt. He was accused of fraudulently overvaluing the assets of the fund, and was convicted of securities fraud after his case went to trial. Lumiere was sentenced to 18 months in prison followed by three years' supervised release and a $1 million fine.

=== Liquidation ===
In the wake of the controversy, Jacob Gottlieb wound down the company he originally founded. Following negotiations with the Securities and Exchange Commission in 2018, the company forfeited $10.2 million to regulators in exchange for being able to shut down. The firm had begun liquidation two years earlier, selling the Visium Global Fund to AllianceBernstein. As of August 19, 2019, the firm was operating under the name VA Management LP.
