= Hrvoje Klasić =

Croatian historian

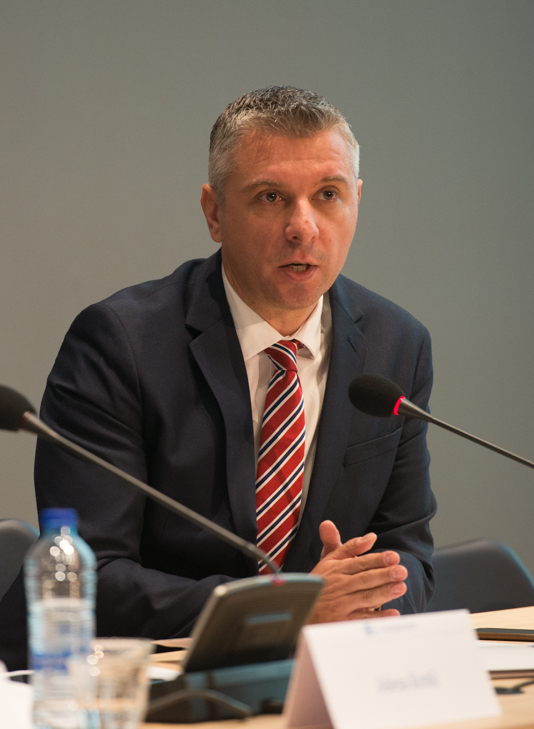
- Hrvoje Klasić in 2017
- Born: 6 December 1972 (age 53); Sisak, SR Croatia, SFR Yugoslavia
- Occupation: Historian
- Political party: Social Democratic Party of Croatia

Hrvoje Klasić (born 6 December 1972) is a Croatian historian. Since 2003, Klasić is a professor at the Department of History at the Faculty of Humanities and Social Sciences of the University of Zagreb. His work focuses on contemporary Croatian and world history. Klasić is a critic of attempts at rehabilitation of the World War II fascist Ustasha movement in the country. He is ambassador for the European Association of History Educators.

== Early life and education ==
Hrvoje Klasić was born in Sisak in SR Croatia, SFR Yugoslavia on 6 December 1972. In 1991, when he was 18, he was a military volunteer in the Croatian Armed forces during the Croatian War of Independence. In an interview for Bosnian daily newspaper Dnevni avaz he sarcastically commented that, if he was a victim of the war, he would be a hero in his town–but since he was not, some consider him today to be a traitor. Klasić completed his undergraduate (in 1997), master and doctoral studies at the Faculty of Humanities and Social Sciences of the University of Zagreb. In 1995–2003 period he was employed as a high school (gymnasium) professor in Sisak.

== Academic career ==
Since 2003, Klasić has been a professor at the Department of History at the Faculty of Humanities and Social Sciences of the University of Zagreb where he teaches courses in Croatian, European, and world history since 1945, politics and propaganda, sports, and the history of the year 1968.

== Public engagement ==
Hrvoje Klasić is a member of the Social Democratic Party of Croatia He is a critic of historical revisionism in Croatia, specifically attempts at rehabilitation of the World War II fascist Ustasha movement in the country, which made him a target of nationalist threats. Klasić welcomed the decision by Austrian authorities in 2021 to ban and sanction the public display of the Croatian Defense Forces, alongside the banning of WWII Ustasha movement’s symbols. Klasić is also critical of unbalanced and negative interpretation of Yugoslavism claiming that the idea has a long history among Croat intellectual elites including the Roman Catholic clergy starting with 15th century Vinko Pribojević, and subsequently Josip Juraj Strossmayer and Franjo Rački. His interpretation of the Croatian War of Independence as a "war of aggression with the elements of civil war" was criticized by many in Croatia. He underlined that the war in Croatia started before the international recognition and that the republic's Serb citizens from Petrinja, Vukovar, Glina or Knin fought with Croat citizens which are all elements of a civil war. He underlined that other civil conflicts such as Lebanese Civil War and Spanish Civil War included significant foreign interference which still does not make them exclusively wars of aggression. In February 2020, together with Vesna Teršelič, Dražen Lalić, Žarko Puhovski, and other members of the Antifascist League of Croatia, he condemned an attack on Nataša Kandić by the group allegedly instructed by Vojislav Šešelj, ICTY convicted war criminal and president of nationalist Serbian Radical Party.

In relation to the right-wing bias of the Croatian Wikipedia Hrvoje Klasić stated that "there is a large difference" between English and Croatian Wikipedia. He stated that occasionally he tells his students to look something up on English Wikipedia if the article has plenty of academic and scientific references. Contrary he stated that, "I would never give Croatian Wikipedia to my students if they want to learn something about Croatian history. I myself saw that a number of articles and topics were done in a completely revisionist manner, with highly emphasised nationalist and, I would dare to say, pro-Ustasha sentiment."
