= Be like Bill =

Internet meme

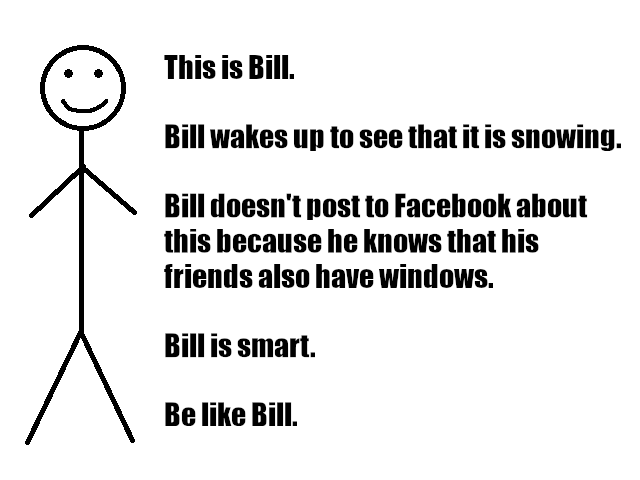
An example of the meme.

"Be like Bill" is a social media meme that was introduced around late 2015, with its popularity greatly increasing in early 2016.

== Meme ==
The "Be like Bill" meme typically features an image of a simple stick figure, who may or may not be wearing a knitted hat, together with text such as "This is Bill. Bill is on Facebook. Bill is a vegan. Bill doesn't tell everybody about it. Bill is smart. Be like Bill." The meme has been described as "a way for people to passive-aggressively call out social media behaviours that annoy them." The meme also attracted a large number of detractors who criticized the meme's tone and lack of self-awareness.

Boston officials used the meme to discourage the use of space savers in parking spots.

The meme has spawned foreign language variants with other characters, including Bilal (Arabic), Rashid (Malaysian), Jose (Spanish), Petya (Russian), Qodos (Dari/Pashto), and Juan (Tagalog). There also exists a female variant with a character named Emily.
