= Serbian Wikipedia =

Serbian-language edition of Wikipedia

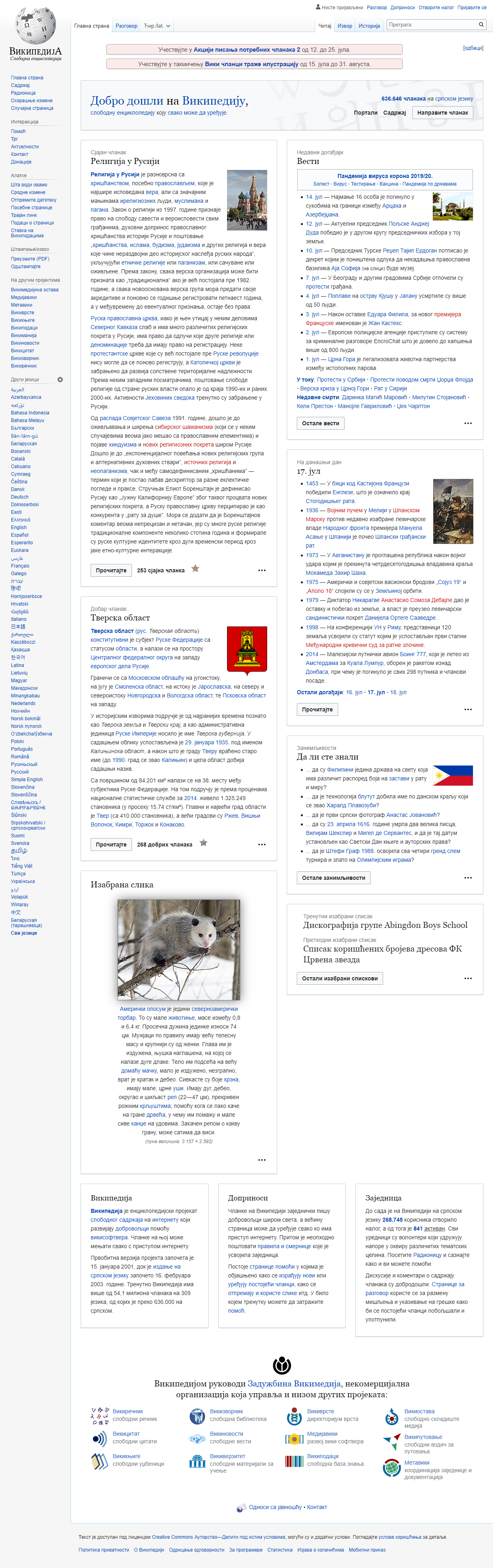
- Screenshot Main page of the Serbian Wikipedia in July 2020
- Website type: Internet encyclopedia project
- Available in: Serbian (Cyrillic/Latin)
- Headquarters: Miami, Florida
- Owner: Wikimedia Foundation
- Website: sr.wikipedia.org
- Commercial: No
- Registration: Optional
- Users: 637,131 (as of 26 October 2026)
- Launched: 16 February 2003; 23 years ago
- Content license: Creative Commons Attribution/ Share-Alike 4.0 (most text also dual-licensed under GFDL); Media licensing varies

The Serbian Wikipedia (Serbian: Википедија на српском језику, romanized: Vikipedija na srpskom jeziku, lit. 'Wikipedia in the Serbian language') is the Serbian-language version of the free online encyclopedia Wikipedia. Created on 16 February 2003, it reached its 100,000th article on 20 November 2009 before getting to another milestone with the 200,000th article on 6 July 2013, and then another milestone with the 500,000th article on 13 January 2018.

It currently has 637,131 registered users (1,508 active ones) and 710,180 articles, making it the fourth largest Wikipedia in a Slavic language and the 24th-largest Wikipedia. By 2023, bots contributed to 53% of the total edits and created 49% of the articles. The Serbian Wikipedia allows readers to switch between Cyrillic and Latin scripts, while edits are made in the script in which the article was originally written.

In the 2020s, Serbian Wikipedia faced criticism for ideological bias, including the promotion of Serbian nationalist narratives and historical revisionism, particularly in coverage of the Yugoslav Wars. Investigations have also raised concerns about bias in articles related to current political events in Serbia, such as anti-corruption protests, where language and framing have aligned with pro-government perspectives.

== History ==
Origin of edits (2011/04 - 2012/03) Source
| Serbia | 79.4% |
| Bosnia and Herzegovina | 7.8% |
| United States | 5.1% |
| Montenegro | 1.9% |
| Croatia | 1.2% |
| Spain | 1.2% |
| United Kingdom | 0.8% |
| Other | 2.6% |

Serbian Wikipedia was created on 16 February 2003. The main page was translated from English into Serbian on 22 April 2003 by an unknown user with IP address 80.131.158.32 (possibly from Freiburg, Germany), and user Nikola Smolenski finished the translation on 24 May.

During September 2003, Smolenski prepared the main page along with creating some basic article stubs. In the October 2003 issue of the Serbian IT magazine Svet kompjutera his article about wikis and Wikipedia got published, leading to a surge of new users, both registered and anonymous. Around the same time, Smolenski also translated the user interface page into Serbian.

== Variants ==
Serbian uses two alphabets, Cyrillic and Latin. It also has two official accents: Ekavian and Ijekavian. Combining the scripts and accents give four written variants (Ekavian Cyrillic, Ijekavian Cyrillic, Ekavian Latin, and Ijekavian Latin).

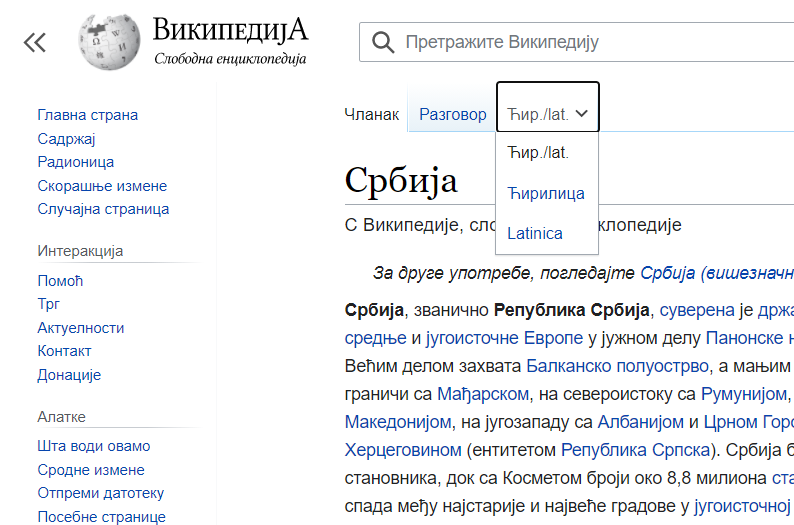
The Cyrillic-Latin transliteration interface.

When the Serbian Wikipedia was founded, it used only the Cyrillic alphabet, and both standard dialects. However, since both alphabets are widely used by Serbian native speakers, an effort began to enable the parallel usage of both Cyrillic and Latin alphabets. The first attempt was to use a bot for dynamic transliteration of every article. About 1,000 articles were transliterated before the action was stopped due to technical difficulties. This concept was later abandoned in favor of a model used by the Chinese Wikipedia. After a few months, the software was completed and now every visitor has the option to choose between two alphabets using tabs at the top of each article. There are special tags used to indicate those words which should not be transliterated (for example, names and words written in foreign languages). Anti-transliteration tags in use are:

- -{text here}-, which prevents transliteration of the article text, and
- __NOTC__ or __БЕЗКН__, which prevents transliteration of the article's name.

Though there are still minor technical issues, Cyrillic-Latin transliteration is working successfully.

Ekavian–Ijekavian conversion, however, is much more complicated, and its implementation is not yet complete (it will probably require extensive tables of words in Ekavian and Ijekavian forms). However, despite the difficulties, this is probably the first successful attempt to develop the software which will allow parallel work on all four variants of Serbian.

== Community ==
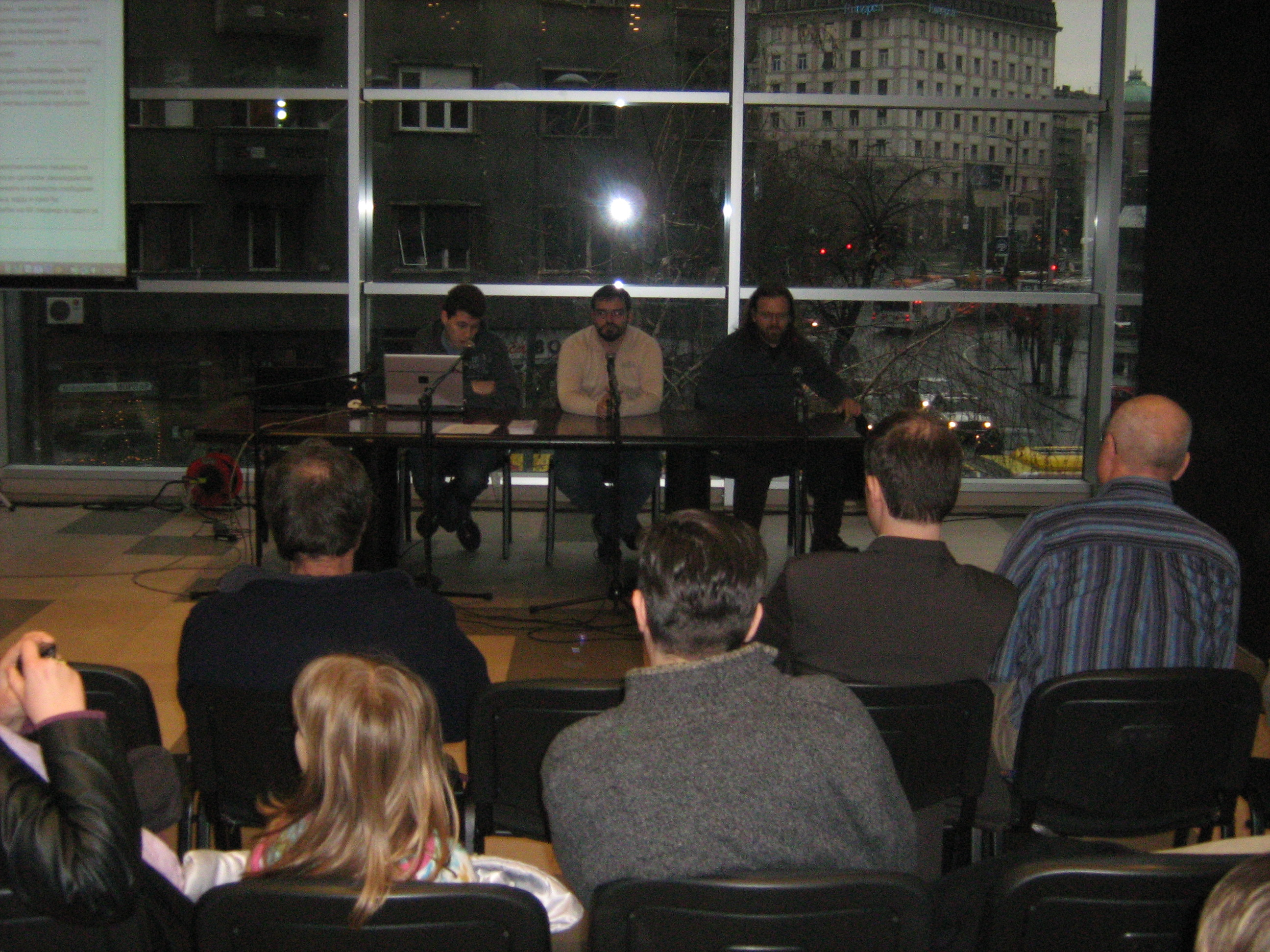
Third annual regional Wikimedia conference at the Belgrade Youth Center in December 2008.

Ever since the inaugural meeting on Tuesday, 15 February 2005, members of the Serbian wiki community have been holding regular gatherings. As of September 2013, 253 meetings took place — mostly in Belgrade, with about a dozen taking place in Novi Sad, along with a few in Niš, Pančevo, and Pirot.

At first congregating at each other's apartments, bars, restaurants, and public parks, by late 2005 community members began gathering at the Belgrade Youth Center, which provided meeting space free of charge. At the first of these Youth Center meetings on Saturday, 3 December 2005, the community members founded the Wikimedia Foundation's local chapter for Serbia and Montenegro called Wikimedia Serbia and Montenegro (Викимедија Србије и Црне Горе / Vikimedija Srbije i Crne Gore). At the time, it was only the fifth local Wikimedia Foundation chapter anywhere in the world.

Following the May 2006 Montenegrin referendum whose outcome led to the breakup of the Serbia and Montenegro state union, the local chapter modified its name to Wikimedia Serbia (Викимедија Србије / Vikimedija Srbije). It is registered as a non-governmental, non-partisan, and non-profit organization and its stated goals include promotion of the creation, gathering and multiplication of free content in Serbian as well as promotion of the idea that everyone should have equal access to knowledge and education. Later that year in December, the Serbian chapter hosted the very first Wikimedia regional conference for Southeast Europe.

Three more regional conferences were put together over the next several years, all of them hosted by Wikimedia Serbia.

In February 2012, Wikimedia Serbia organized an event called Open Wiki GLAM of Serbia as part of the bigger project of the same name. Standing for Galleries, Libraries, Archives & Museums, GLAM is devoted to the topics of Serbian cultural and historical heritage as well as protection of intellectual property and copyright on the Internet. Later that year in December, Wikimedia Serbia got its own office space located in downtown Belgrade at the beginning of the King Aleksandar Boulevard where most of the Serbian wiki community meetings now began to take place.

Serbian Wikipedia ranked #1 in the global 1Lib1Ref campaign in 2020.

== Bias ==
In 2021, Wikimedia Foundation reported that alongside right-wing bias on Croatian Wikipedia, the project in Serbian was also susceptible to right-wing or nationalist bias and historical revisionism.

In 2024, the weekly magazine Vreme reported that Serbian Wikipedia includes content reflecting elements of Serbian nationalism and historical revisionism, particularly in articles related to the Yugoslav Wars. The report states that certain articles minimize or relativize Serbian war crimes and portray contentious historical figures (including war criminals) in a favorable light. Additionally, it described the use of passive language and editorial choices that obscure the accountability of domestic actors, leading to concerns about Serbian Wikipedia's adherence to its neutrality policy.

A 2025 investigation by Radar raised questions about Serbian Wikipedia's coverage of ongoing political events in Serbia, specifically the large-scale anti‑corruption protests. According to the article, Serbian Wikipedia included language and framing aligned with pro‑government narratives. For example, protests were described using terms such as "an attempt at a colour revolution", with vague attribution, and associations were made between protests and separatist movements in Serbia. This kind of framing was described as a possible indication of political bias within editorial practices.

On 30 March 2026, several users mentioned in the 2024 Vreme article received global bans from Wikimedia projects.

== Gallery ==
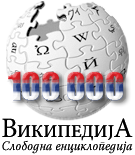
The Serbian Wikipedia's 100K commemorative logo. (11 October 2009)

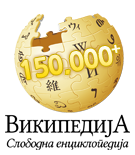
The Serbian Wikipedia's 150K commemorative logo. (20 November 2011)

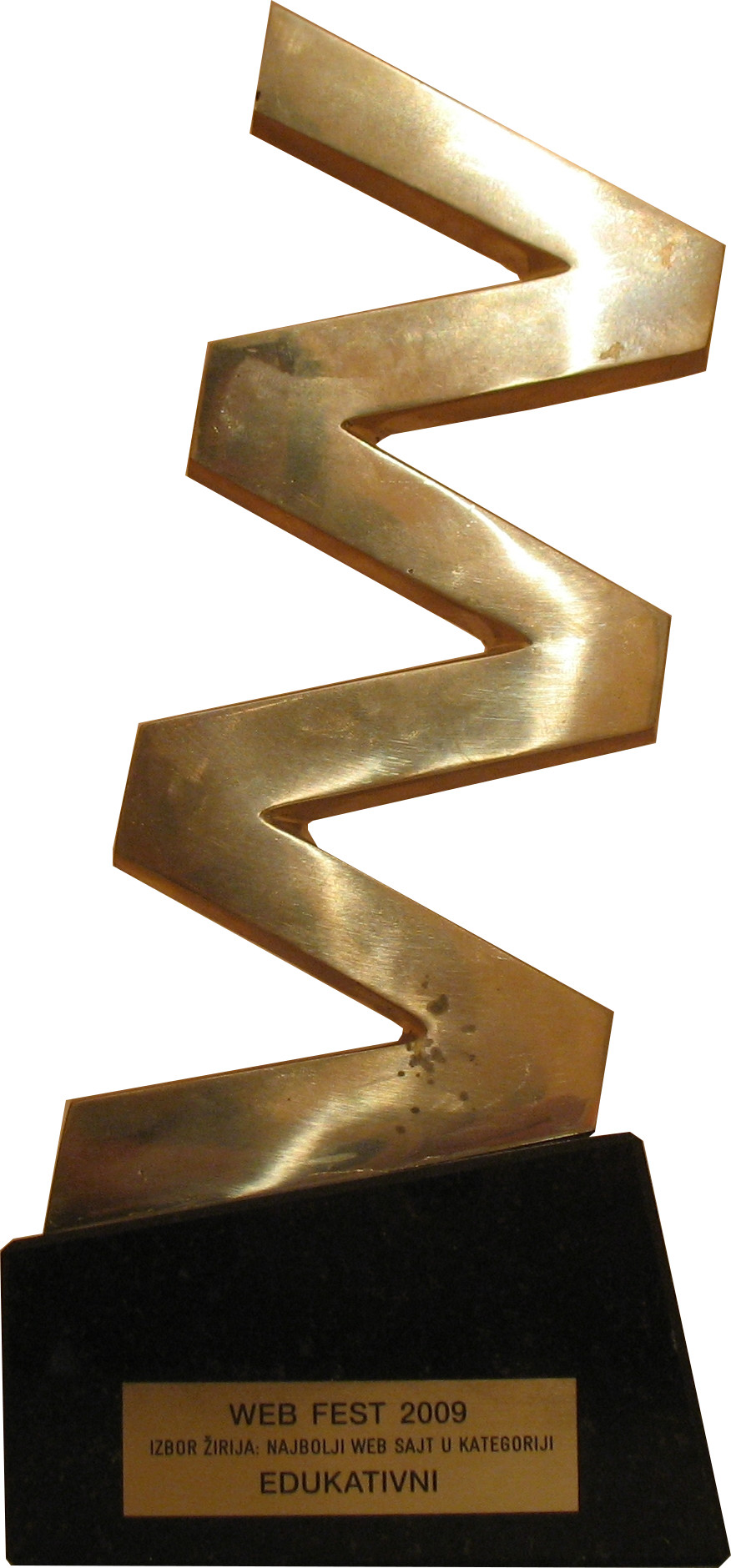
Web Fest 2009 award in the 'best educational site in Serbia' category for sr.wikipedia.org
