= Wiki-PR Wikipedia editing scandal =

Consulting firm commercially editing Wikipedia

Wiki-PR
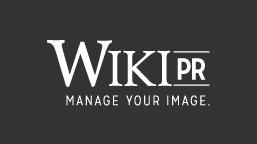
- Type: Consulting firm
- Industry: Public relations, Consulting
- Founded: 2010
- Founder: Jordan French; Darius Fisher
- Headquarters: Austin, Texas, United States
- Key people: Jordan French (CEO); Darius Fisher (COO)

Wiki-PR was a consulting firm that marketed the ability to edit Wikipedia by "directly edit[ing] your page using our network of established Wikipedia editors and admins".

It received media attention in 2013 after a sockpuppet investigation resulted in more than 250 Wikipedia user accounts being blocked or banned. The Wikimedia Foundation changed its terms of use in the wake of the investigation, requiring anyone paid to edit Wikipedia to openly disclose their affiliations. Despite the ban, Status Labs, a firm started in 2012 by Wiki-PR founders Jordan French and Darius Fisher, continued to edit clients' Wikipedia articles according to former employees. The Wiki-PR website continued to advertise its services through at least June 20, 2025.

== Company ==
Wiki-PR was created in 2010 by Darius Fisher, its chief operating officer as of 2014, and Jordan French, its chief executive officer as of 2014. Confirmed clients include Priceline and Emad Rahim, and suspected clients include Viacom, among many others. The firm claimed to have Wikipedia administrator access enabling it to manage the Wikipedia presence of more than 12,000 clients. Wiki-PR has been reported to have used "aggressive email marketing" to acquire new customers.

== Investigation and company reaction ==
An investigation of sockpuppet accounts on Wikipedia that began in 2012 implicated hundreds of accounts. Wiki-PR's involvement was confirmed after four customers of Wiki-PR spoke anonymously to The Daily Dot journalist Simon Owens, and two others, Priceline.com and Emad Rahim, spoke to Vice journalist Martin Robbins. In addition to violating rules against sockpuppeting, Wiki-PR violated Wikipedia rules by citing articles that were planted on business content farms and various other websites that accept contributions from any Internet user as sources for Wikipedia entries, creating a false impression of credibility. The same websites were used repeatedly, and their presence in various Wikipedia articles aided investigators in identifying articles the company had worked on.

The investigation led to the Wikipedia community blocking hundreds of paid Wikipedia editing accounts believed to be connected to Wiki-PR that had edited contrary to Wikipedia's rules.

In 2014 The New York Times described Wiki-PR's methods. "Wiki-PR uses a lot of people, with different identities, to edit pages for paying customers and to manage those pages. The paid sock puppets are ready to pounce on edits that don't adhere to the client's vision."

In The Wall Street Journal, French was quoted as saying that Wiki-PR is a research and writing firm, counseling clients on "how to adhere to Wikipedia's rules". French said that its paid work is part of the "fabric" of Wikipedia, complementing the work of unpaid volunteers. French acknowledged that Wiki-PR had sometimes made "bad calls" on the notability of articles. He also said that "We do pay hundreds of other editors for their work—they're real people and not sockpuppets." Instead, as was reported by the International Business Times, Wiki-PR had been involved in "meatpuppetry"—a practice in which editors illegitimately encourage other individuals to edit in support of their position—in addition to planting articles online to try to garner better potential notability for its clients.

== Wikipedia and Wikimedia's reaction ==
As of October 25, 2013, Wiki-PR, including all of its employees, contractors, and owners, were banned from editing Wikipedia. Sue Gardner, executive director of the Wikimedia Foundation, stated that the Foundation was "exploring our options". On November 19, 2013, Wikimedia's law firm, Cooley LLP, emailed a cease-and-desist letter to Wiki-PR. French told The Guardian that Wiki-PR "is working with the Wikimedia Foundation and its counsel to sort this out", and hoped to have further information in a week's time. The Wikimedia Foundation acknowledged communicating with Wiki-PR, but the Foundation rejected any implication that they were negotiating with Wiki-PR, saying that if Wiki-PR wanted to continue editing, Wiki-PR must turn to Wikipedia's community.

In June 2014, the Wikimedia Foundation updated its terms of use, forbidding undisclosed paid editing and requiring any paid editors to disclose their affiliation. The blog post announcing the change stated that "Undisclosed paid advocacy editing is a black hat practice that can threaten the trust of Wikimedia's volunteers and readers. We have serious concerns about the way that such editing affects the neutrality and reliability of Wikipedia." Later in 2014, a number of large PR firms pledged to follow Wikipedia's new and existing guidelines.

As of October 2026, the company website remained active, though with an expired SSL certificate.
