= Croatian Wikipedia =

Croatian-language edition of Wikipedia

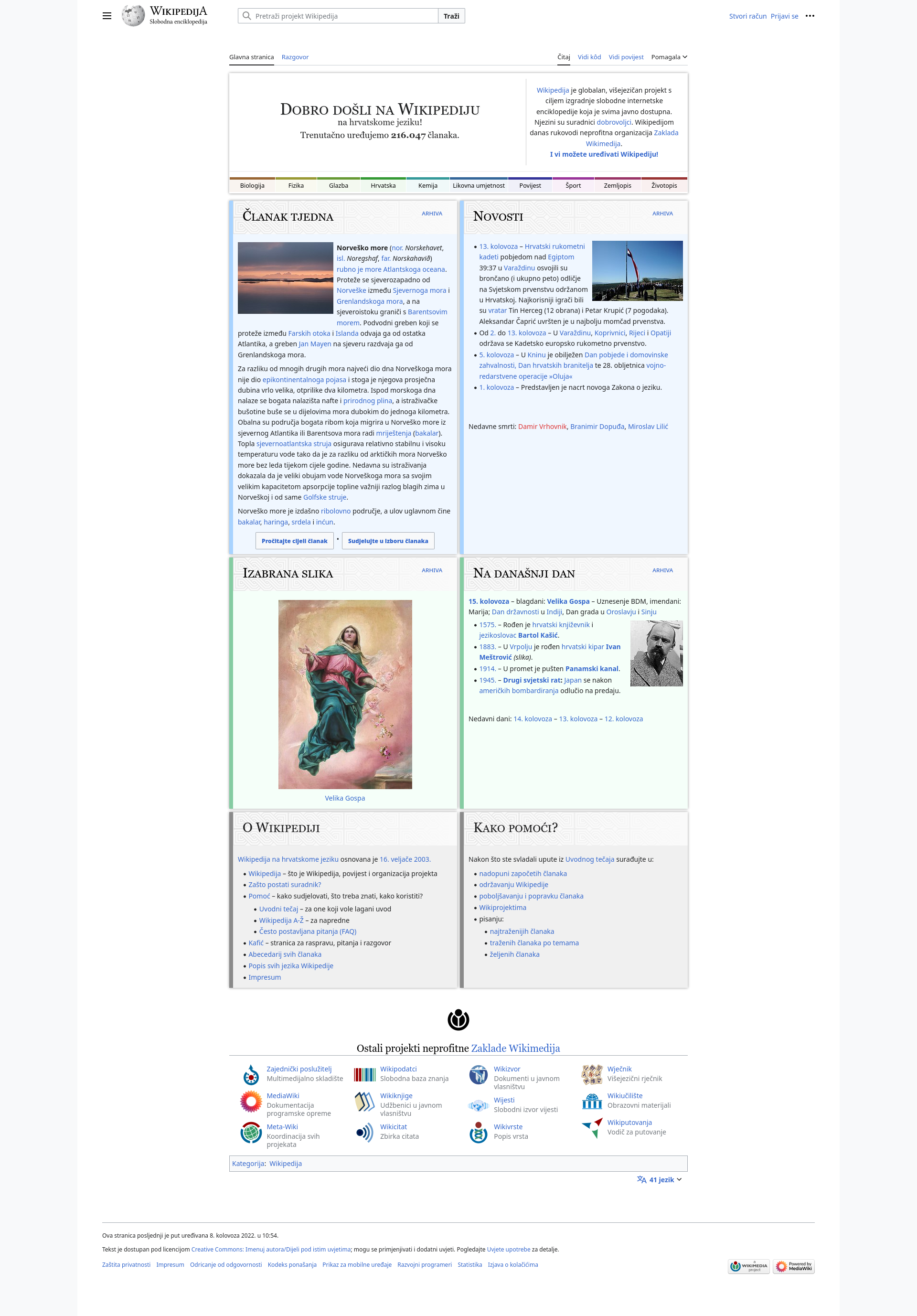
- Screenshot Croatian Wikipedia's Main Page on 17 January 2021
- Website type: Internet encyclopedia project
- Available in: Croatian
- Owner: Wikimedia Foundation
- Website: hr.wikipedia.org
- Commercial: No
- Registration: Optional
- Launched: 16 February 2003; 23 years ago
- Content license: Creative Commons Attribution/ Share-Alike 4.0 (most text also dual-licensed under GFDL); Media licensing varies

The Croatian Wikipedia (Croatian: Wikipedija na hrvatskome jeziku) is the Croatian language version of Wikipedia, which was created on 16 February 2003. It has 236,784 articles and a total of 7.63 million edits. It has 375,180 registered users, out of which 1,034 have been active in the last 30 days, and 14 administrators. Throughout 2014, fewer than two dozen editors made more than 100 edits a month; around 150 made more than 5 edits a month. As of July 2024, there were about 135 editors making at least 5 edits a month.

Between 2013 and 2021, the Croatian Wikipedia received attention from international media for promoting a Croatian nationalist far-right worldview, including anti-LGBT propaganda and bias against the Serbs of Croatia through historical denialism and the negation or dilution of the severity of crimes committed by the Ustaše regime under the Independent State of Croatia. The crimes of World War II–era criminals, as well as those of contemporary Croatian politicians and public figures, were whitewashed, supported by massive usage of unreliable sources, all of which received negative reception from the Croatian government, media, and historians. Several editors involved in co-opting Croatian Wikipedia throughout the 2010s were banned or demoted in 2021, when one of the most active administrators, under the username "Kubura", was found to have taken control of the site through approximately eighty sockpuppet accounts.

== 2011 reliability analysis ==
In a 2011 study by Kubelka and Šoštarić, the reliability of Croatian Wikipedia was compared to Croatian Encyclopedia – the Croatian national encyclopedia. Twenty-four reviewers, experts in specific fields, analyzed a representative selection of articles according to the parameters of informativeness, accuracy of presented information, sufficiency, direction and objectivity. Articles were analyzed in 11 thematic categories: arts and culture; history and biographies; medicine and health; technology and applied science; geography; religion; science; mathematics and logic; philosophy; sport and society; and social sciences. Articles were sorted into categories using machine learning techniques, and feature weight statistics were calculated using tf–idf. A total of 500 articles in 250 pairs were randomly chosen and sorted into categories to serve as representative samples.

In both samples, facts were manually enumerated – 3015 from the Croatian Encyclopedia and 3315 from Croatian Wikipedia. Comparison for factual accuracy showed that for every error in the Croatian Encyclopedia, 2.25 errors were found in Croatian Wikipedia. Analysis by individual categories showed that most errors in Croatian Wikipedia were in the philosophy category, where on average two errors in ten articles were found. The only category where the Croatian Encyclopedia had more errors was natural sciences, where the ratio was 1.25:0.75 in favor of Croatian Wikipedia. Of those factual errors, the ratio was 21:12 for major errors, and 34:23 for minor errors. The overall ratio for minor factual errors was thus lower, the only exception being the society and social sciences category, where the minor error ratio was 3:1.

The reliability analysis for Croatian Wikipedia indicated that 74% of articles were error-free, and 11% had minor errors. Major factual errors were found in 5% of articles, while 4% of articles had both major and minor errors. Overall 85% of articles were deemed "satisfactory" (error-free and containing minor errors), while in comparison 92% of articles in the Croatian Encyclopedia achieved the same rating. 40% of articles in Croatian Wikipedia were assessed as sufficiently informative, as opposed to 62% of articles in Croatian Encyclopedia. 16% of Croatian Wikipedia articles were assessed as "insufficiently informative", as opposed to 5% of articles from Croatian Encyclopedia. The criterion of objectivity measured the neutral point of view in articles; 91% of Croatian Wikipedia articles were assessed as neutral, as opposed to 98% in Croatian Encyclopedia. 2% of Croatian Wikipedia articles were assessed as non-neutral, as opposed to 0% in Croatian Encyclopedia. According to their subjective preference, reviewers chose 53% of articles in Croatian Encyclopedia as their preferred article version, while only 19.5% of Wikipedia articles were preferred, with 27% of articles being assessed as equal in quality.

== Controversies ==
=== Media reports about political bias ===
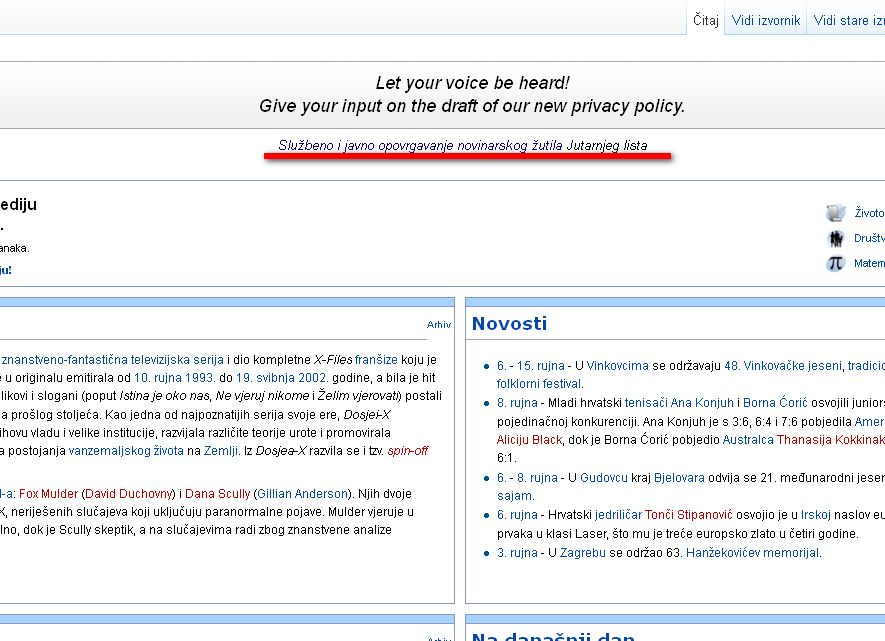
Croatian Wikipedia sitenotice that translates to "official and public refutation of yellow journalism by Jutarnji list"

In September 2013, complaints about right-wing bias of administrators and editors on the Croatian Wikipedia began to receive attention from the media, following the launch of a Facebook page titled Razotkrivanje sramotne hr.wikipedije (Exposing the disgraceful hr.wikipedia) which was created with the intent of bringing attention to the issue. According to Jurica Pavičić, a professor at the University of Split and columnist for daily newspaper Jutarnji list, the gradual takeover of the Croatian Wikipedia was started in 2009 by "a small group of conservative administrators" who blocked editors for having "liberal-to-moderate views on controversial topics". Reported examples of bias include historical negationism such as watering-down and denial of the crimes committed by the Ustaše regime, and equating anti-fascism with forms of totalitarianism. Other issues included the bias against Serbs of Croatia and the LGBT population. Editors who tried to remove the biased sections were reportedly being harassed by administrators and quickly received permanent blocks under various pretexts. The issue was reported by Jutarnji list and featured on the front page of its print edition on 11 September 2013.

=== Government reaction ===
Two days later, Croatia's Minister of Science, Education and Sports, Željko Jovanović, called for students in Croatia to avoid using Croatian Wikipedia. In an interview with Novi list, Jovanović stated:

the idea of openness and relevance as a knowledge source that Wikipedia could and should represent has been completely discredited – which, for certain, has never been the goal of Wikipedia's creators nor the huge number of people around the world who share their knowledge and time using that medium. Croatian pupils and students have been wronged by this, so we have to warn them, unfortunately, that a large part of the content of the Croatian version of Wikipedia is not only dubious but also [contains] obvious forgeries, and therefore we invite them to use more reliable sources of information, which include Wikipedia in English and in other major languages of the world.

Jovanović also referred to Croatian Wikipedia editors as a "minority group that has usurped the right to edit the Croatian-language Wikipedia". Wikipedia's co-founder Jimmy Wales said that complaints about bias on Croatian Wikipedia were "nothing new", but that Jovanović's denunciation was alarming. Wales reiterated his opinion that separating Croatian and Serbian Wikipedias was wrong, as they "in fact use the same language".

=== Interviews with historians ===
In 2013, in an interview given to Index.hr, Robert Kurelić, a professor of history at the Juraj Dobrila University of Pula, commented that "the Croatian Wikipedia is only a tool used by its administrators to promote their own political agendas, giving false and distorted facts". Some examples he listed include the Croatian Wikipedia's coverage of the term Istrijanstvo (Istrianism), defined as a "movement fabricated to reduce the number of Croats", and antifašizam (anti-fascism), which according to him was defined as the opposite of what it really means. Kurelić further advised "that it would be good if a larger number of people got engaged and started writing on Wikipedia", because "administrators want to exploit high-school and university students, the most common users of Wikipedia, to change their opinions and attitudes, which presents a serious issue".

Also in 2013, Snježana Koren, a historian at the Faculty of Humanities and Social Sciences, University of Zagreb, judged the disputed articles as "biased and malicious, partly even illiterate", in an interview with Croatian news agency HINA. She further added that "These are the types of articles you can find on the pages of fringe organizations and movements, but there should be no place for that on Wikipedia", expressing doubts on the ability of its authors to distinguish good from evil. Koren concluded that the ulterior motive of such writings was to rehabilitate the Independent State of Croatia, a puppet state of Nazi Germany, and that "there is no other way to characterize such efforts than as Ustaše movement".

The Croatian Wikipedia page on the Jasenovac concentration camp was regarded as a prime example of its historical negationism and distortions. The Croatian version of the page referred to the WWII Jasenovac concentration camp as a "collection camp" and labour camp, downplayed the crimes committed there as well as the number of victims, and relied on "right-wing media and private blogs" for "a large number" of its references. Hrvoje Klasić, also a historian at the Faculty of Humanities and Social Sciences in Zagreb, stated to the Balkan Investigative Reporting Network in 2018 that "although Jasenovac was in part a labour camp, referring to it as that alone is misleading", arguing that "referring to Jasenovac as simply a collection and labour camp is to use 'the same language' as Ustasa propaganda", and also added that "a number of articles and topics are done in a completely revisionist manner [on the Croatian Wikipedia], with highly emphasised nationalist and, I would dare to say, pro-Ustasa sentiment".

=== Disinformation assessment by Wikimedia Foundation ===
The final assessment, June 2021

In 2021, the Wikimedia Foundation posted a job ad for a disinformation evaluator position, with the aim to further examine disputed content on the Croatian Wikipedia. In March 2021, a number of changes were made to remove administrative access from a group of editors considered responsible for the entire affair, some of whom had their names published in Croatian media. One of these was exposed to be a known far-right web portal editor, who passed off his self-published materials as "reliable sources" on the Croatian Wikipedia. In April 2021, an article was published by the Western Balkans edition of Radio Free Europe stating how the situation of the Croatian-language Wikipedia has finally changed and that the correction of problematic articles was in progress. Editing activity picked up from 2020 through early 2022, with over 200 editors making at least 5 edits a month. As of July 2024, there were about 135 editors making at least 5 edits a month.

In June 2021, Wikimedia published a Croatian Wikipedia Disinformation Assessment, which was conducted by an external expert. The report concluded that "a group of Croatian language Wikipedia (Hr.WP) admins held undue de facto control over the project at least from 2011 to 2020. During that time, the group intentionally distorted the content presented in Croatian language Wikipedia articles in a way that matched the narratives of political organisations and groups that can broadly be defined as the Croatian radical right." According to the assessment, the administrators had abused their power to ban dissidents and selectively enforce and break rules, resulting in project capture.
