= Elizabeth Cosgriff-Hernandez =

American biomedical engineer

- Born: Elizabeth Marie Christenson
- Education: Case Western Reserve University
- Known for: Biomedical engineering
- Scientific career
- Workplaces: University of Texas at Austin; Texas A&M University; Rice University
- Thesis: Biostability and biocompatibility of modified polyurethane elastomers (2005)
- Doctoral advisor: Anne Hiltner

Elizabeth Cosgriff-Hernandez is an American biomedical engineer who is a professor and the Judson S. Swearingen Regents Chair in Engineering #2 at the University of Texas at Austin. Her work involves the development of polymeric biomaterials for medical devices and tissue regeneration. She is a co-founder of Rhythio Medical, on the scientific advisory board of ECM Biosurgery, and a consultant to several companies on biostability evaluation of medical devices. Dr. Cosgriff-Hernandez is an associate editor of the Journal of Materials Chemistry B and Fellow of the International Union of Societies for Biomaterials Science and Engineering, Biomedical Engineering Society, Tissue Engineering and Regenerative Medicine International Society, American Chemical Society Division of Polymeric Materials: Science and Engineering, Royal Society of Chemistry, and the American Institute for Medical and Biological Engineering. In 2025, she was named a Senior Member of the National Academy of Inventors.

== Early life and education ==
Cosgriff-Hernandez was an undergraduate student at Case Western Reserve University, majoring in biomedical engineering. She focused on macromolecular science and engineering for her graduate studies, where she worked under the supervision of Drs. Anne Hiltner and Jim Anderson. Cosgriff-Hernandez was appointed as a UT-TORCH postdoctoral fellow at Rice University, where she focused on orthopedic tissue engineering under the direction of Dr. Tony Mikos.

== Research and career ==
Dr. Cosgriff-Hernandez joined the faculty of the Biomedical Engineering Department at Texas A&M University in 2007 prior to moving to University of Texas at Austin in 2017. Her laboratory specializes in the development of polymeric biomaterials to improve clinical outcomes of medical devices and regeneration strategies in the areas of orthopedics, cardiovascular devices, chronic wound healing, and women’s health. Synthesis of new biomaterials with targeted cell interactions is complemented by advanced fabrication strategies. In addition to providing improved medical devices and tissue grafts, these innovative biomaterials provide new tools to probe complex processes of tissue function and remodeling. She is a co-founder of Rhythio Medical, on the scientific advisory board of ECM Biosurgery, and a consultant to several companies on biostability evaluation of medical devices. Dr. Cosgriff-Hernandez is an Associate Editor of the Journal of Materials Chemistry B and has previously served as an Associate Editor of the Journal of Biomedical Materials Research, Part B and chair of the NIH study section on Musculoskeletal Tissue Engineering.

In October 2025, the U.S. Food and Drug Administration (FDA) granted Breakthrough Device Designation to Rhythio Medical's injectable hydrogel electrode technology, which Cosgriff-Hernandez co-developed to enable painless, imperceptible defibrillation and pacing. Additionally, in February 2025, she was awarded a $3.1 million NIH grant to develop patient-centric vaginal stents designed to prevent post-radiation stenosis in cancer patients.

Alongside her research on novel materials, Cosgriff-Hernandez is involved with initiatives to promote equity and diversity within the sciences. She has served on the Diversity Committee of the Biomedical Engineering Society, DEI Committee of the Society for Biomaterials, and Chair of the Women's Initiatives Committee of the American Institute of Chemical Engineers. In 2020, she partnered with Kelly Stevens, Karmella Haynes, Lola Eniola-Adefeso to investigate disparities in National Institutes of Health funding for Black researchers. In 2025, she launched the "Health Equity in Engineering Design" course at UT Austin, the first curriculum at the institution to integrate health equity into the undergraduate biomedical engineering program.

== Awards and honors ==
- 2016 Dean of Engineering Excellence Award
- 2017 Elected Fellow to the American Institute for Medical and Biological Engineering (AIMBE)
- 2020 Gilbreth Lecturer, National Academy of Engineering
- 2020 Elected Fellow to the International Union of Societies for Biomaterials Science and Engineering
- 2020 Elected Fellow to the Biomedical Engineering Society
- 2021 Elected Fellow to the Royal Society of Chemistry
- 2023 Elected Fellow American Chemical Society Division of Polymeric Materials: Science and Engineering
- 2024 Elected Fellow to the Tissue Engineering and Regenerative Medicine International Society
- 2025 Senior Member, National Academy of Inventors (NAI)
- 2025 Acta Materialia Mary Fortune Global Diversity Medal

== Industry Impact and Entrepreneurship ==
In addition to her academic work, Cosgriff-Hernandez has contributed to the commercialization of biomedical innovations. She co-founded Rhythio Medical, which focuses on injectable hydrogel electrode technologies. She has served on scientific advisory boards, advised medical device companies, and holds multiple patents related to polymeric biomaterials for clinical applications. Her innovations have supported advances in tissue engineering and patient-centered medical equipment. Several of her technologies have received recognition from regulatory bodies, including the Breakthrough Device Designation from the U.S. Food and Drug Administration (FDA). Her work on injectable hydrogel electrodes has enabled new approaches for treating ventricular arrhythmia, including hydrogel-based pacing modalities that could prevent deadly heart rhythm disorders. She has collaborated with hospitals and industry partners to translate laboratory research into clinical applications, particularly in women’s health and cardiovascular devices.She has also contributed to the design of small-diameter vascular grafts with enhanced compliance and kink resistance, which aim to improve long-term outcomes in coronary artery bypass graft procedures In 2017, Cosgriff-Hernandez was elected a Fellow of the American Institute for Medical and Biological Engineering (AIMBE). for her outstanding contributions to biomaterial and tissue engineering research, including biodegradation characterization, biomaterial development, and scaffold fabrication. Her work facilitates the translation of academic research into real-world medical solutions.

== Selected publications ==
- Janet R Xavier; Teena Thakur; Prachi Desai; Manish K Jaiswal; Nick Sears; Elizabeth Cosgriff-Hernandez; Roland Kaunas; Akhilesh K Gaharwar (25 February 2015). "Bioactive nanoengineered hydrogels for bone tissue engineering: a growth-factor-free approach". ACS Nano. 9 (3): 3109–3118. doi:10.1021/nn507488s. ISSN 1936-0851. PMID 25674809. Wikidata Q38910461.
- Elizabeth M Christenson; Kristi S Anseth; Jeroen van den Beucken; et al. (1 January 2007). "Nanobiomaterial applications in orthopedics". Journal of Orthopaedic Research. 25 (1): 11–22. doi:10.1002/jor.20305. ISSN 0736-0266. PMID 17048259. Wikidata Q36626910.
- Roya M. Nezarati; Michelle B. Eifert; Elizabeth Cosgriff-Hernandez (10 April 2013). "Effects of humidity and solution viscosity on electrospun fiber morphology". Tissue Engineering. Part C. Methods. 19 (10): 810–819. doi:10.1089/ten.tec.2012.0671. ISSN 1937-3384. PMC 3751372. PMID 23469941. Wikidata Q42565312.
- Green, M.D.; Lanier, O.L.; Fleming, G.C.; Cosgriff-Hernandez, E. (July 2025). "Introducing Health Equity into Biomedical Engineering Education." Biomedical Engineering Education. 5 (2): 389-395. doi:10.1007/s43823-025-00084-2.
