= Antonios Mikos =

Greek-American biomedical engineer

Antonios G. Mikos
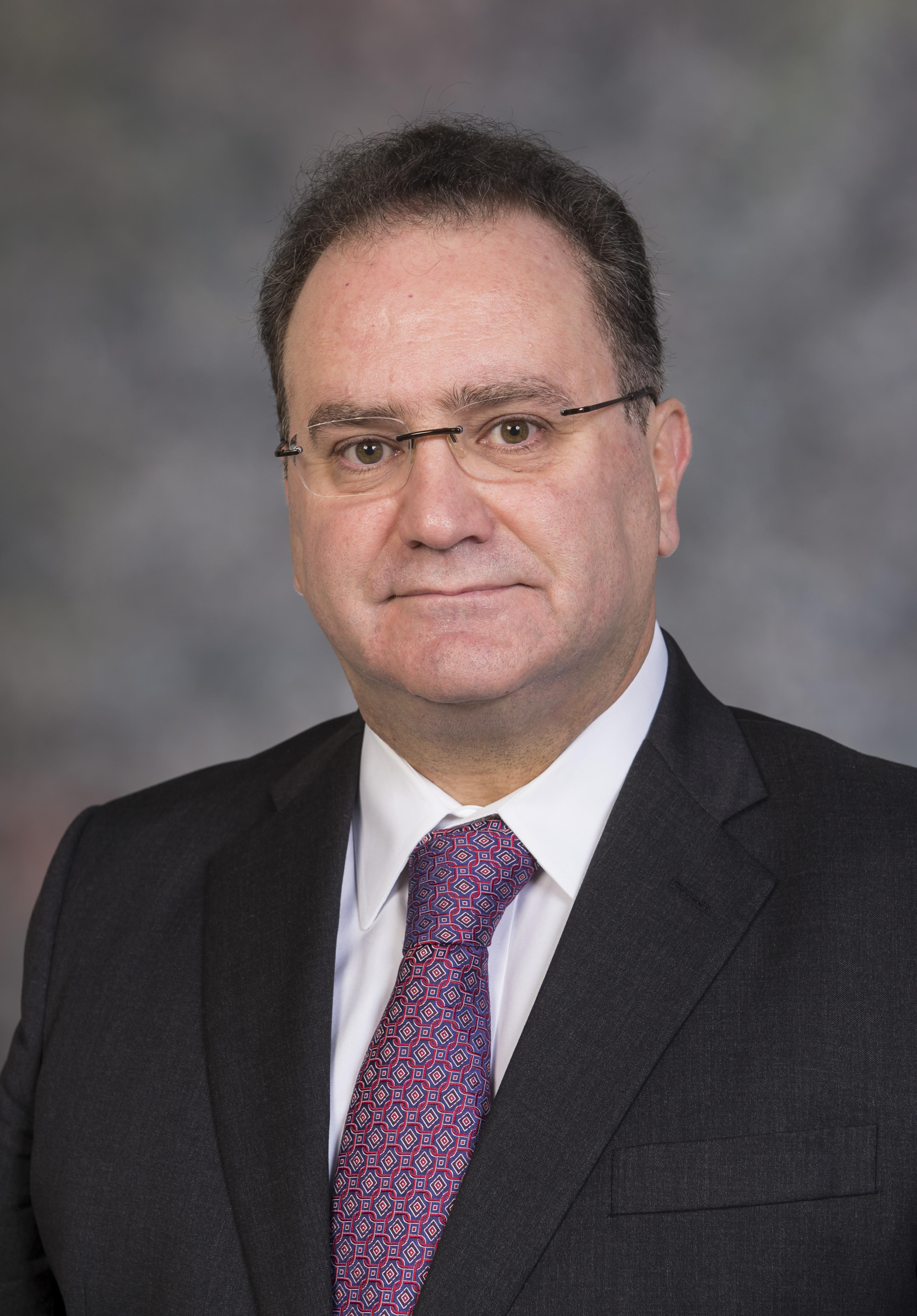
- Born: December 30, 1960 (age 65); Thessaloniki, Greece
- Education: Aristotle University of Thessaloniki, Purdue University
- Known for: Biomaterials science
- Awards: Acta Biomaterialia Gold Medal (2019), Lifetime Achievement Award, Tissue Engineering and Regenerative Medicine International Society-Americas (2015), Founders Award, Society For Biomaterials (2011), Robert A. Pritzker Distinguished Lecturer Award, Biomedical Engineering Society (2007)
- Scientific career
- Fields: Bioengineering, Chemical and Biomolecular Engineering
- Workplaces: Rice University
- Doctoral advisor: Nicholas A. Peppas
- Other academic advisors: Robert S. Langer, Joseph P. Vacanti
- Website: http://mikoslab.rice.edu/

Antonios Georgios Mikos (born 1960) is a Greek-American biomedical engineer who is the Louis Calder Professor of Bioengineering and Chemical and Biomolecular Engineering at Rice University. He specialises in biomaterials, drug delivery, and tissue engineering.

== Education ==
Mikos completed undergraduate study in engineering at the Aristotle University of Thessaloniki (Dipl. Eng., 1983), and pursued a master's and doctorate (M.S. in chemical engineering, 1985 and Ph.D. in chemical engineering, 1988) at Purdue University in the United States. After his doctoral studies, he performed his postdoctoral work at Massachusetts Institute of Technology and the Harvard Medical School.

== Career ==
Mikos is the Louis Calder Professor of Bioengineering and Chemical and Biomolecular Engineering at Rice University in Houston, Texas. He is also the Director of the National Institutes of Health Center for Engineering Complex Tissues, Director of the Center for Excellence in Tissue Engineering, and Director of the John W. Cox Laboratory of Biomedical Engineering at Rice University.

Mikos' research centers on developing biomaterial systems for tissue engineering, drug delivery, gene delivery, and disease modeling. His has studied cartilage, bone, muscle, and cardiovascular engineering, controlled release platforms for growth factors, non-viral vectors, and scaffolds for studying tumor microenvironments. In 2021, he began studying 3D printing for tissue engineering and hydrogel systems for bone and cartilage regeneration.

He co-authored a textbook entitled Biomaterials: The Intersection of Biology and Materials Science.

Mikos founded the journals Tissue Engineering Part A, Tissue Engineering Part B: Review, and Tissue Engineering Part C: Methods and currently serves as their editor-in-chief. He also serves on the editorial boards of multiple other journals including Advanced Drug Delivery Reviews, Cell Transplantation, Journal of Biomaterials Science Polymer Edition, Journal of Biomedical Materials Research (Part A and B), and Journal of Controlled Release. He has an annual short course on tissue engineering at Rice University since 1993.
