= Željko Reiner =

Croatian physician, politician and university professor

Academician Željko Reiner
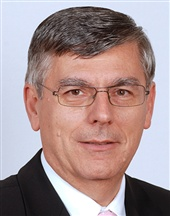

Deputy speaker of the Croatian Parliament
- Incumbent
- Assumed office 14 October 2016
- Speaker: Božo Petrov; Gordan Jandroković

Speaker of the Croatian Parliament
- In office 28 December 2015 – 14 October 2016
- Preceded by: Josip Leko
- Succeeded by: Božo Petrov

Minister of Health and Social Welfare
- In office 14 May 1998 – 27 January 2000
- Prime Minister: Zlatko Mateša
- Preceded by: Andrija Hebrang
- Succeeded by: Ana Stavljenić-Rukavina

Member of the Croatian Parliament for Electoral district I
- Incumbent
- Assumed office 28 December 2015
- Prime Minister: Zoran Milanović; Tihomir Orešković; Andrej Plenković

Personal details
- Born: 28 May 1953 (age 73) Zagreb, PR Croatia, FPR Yugoslavia (modern Croatia)
- Party: HDZ
- Children: 2
- Relatives: Stjepan Sarkotić (great-great-uncle); Dragutin Lerman (great-uncle)
- Education: University of Zagreb
- Profession: Physician

Military service
- Years of service: 1991–1995
- Rank: Colonel

Željko Reiner (born 28 May 1953) is a Croatian physician, politician, university professor, member of the Croatian Academy of Sciences and Arts and former Minister of Health and Social Welfare who served as the 10th Speaker of the Croatian Parliament since independence and the 20th speaker overall, from December 2015 until October 2016.

== Early life and education ==
Reiner was born in Zagreb on 28 May 1953. His paternal family originates from Austria; his great-grandfather moved from Veliki Bečkerek, Kingdom of Hungary (modern-day Zrenjanin, Vojvodina, Serbia) to Slavonska Požega. His grandmother was a niece of Stjepan Sarkotić, while his father was a nephew of Dragutin Lerman. His mother was born on Krk to an Istrian family.

He attended a Zagreb elementary school and then the Classical Gymnasium in Zagreb. He graduated from the School of Medicine, University of Zagreb in 1976. In 1978 he received his master's degree, and in 1982 doctorate. From 1979 to 1983 he specialized internal medicine at the Sisters of Charity Hospital and at the University Medical Center Hamburg-Eppendorf in Germany. He obtained his habilitation in Oklahoma City from 1984 to 1985.

== Career ==
In 1986 Reiner was appointed as docent at the School of Medicine, University of Zagreb, and in 1988 as a professor. From 1997 he is regular professor of internal medicine, and from 2009 regular professor at the University of Rijeka. In 1986 he was employed as the Chief Medical Officer of the "Clinical department of medical Oncology clinic", University Hospital Centre Zagreb. Reiner remained in this position until 1995 when he was appointed head officer of the "Department of Internal Medicine" at the University Hospital Centre, Zagreb. He worked there until 2003 and in 2011 he was again elected to that position. He is also head officer of the "Institute for Metabolic Diseases" at the same hospital. From 2004 to 2012 Reiner was the hospital's Chief executive officer. During his tenure the University Hospital Centre Zagreb was expanded and received modern equipment, and is now one and a half times the size it was before Reiner stepped in. He has been a member of the Croatian Academy of Medical Sciences since 1990, and from 2004 to 2012 he was the academy's president. From 1992 to 2006 he was a member-associate of the Croatian Academy of Sciences and Arts, and from 2006 regular member and academician. In 2011 he was named an honorary member of the Academy of Medical Sciences of Bosnia and Herzegovina. From 2000 to 2006 he was the chairman of the Department of Internal Medicine at the School of Medicine, University of Zagreb.

Reiner published 543 academic-scientific articles. He was a visiting professor at several universities in the United States and Europe, speaker at a number of European and international conferences, member of scientific committee at almost all European and international conferences in the field of atherosclerosis and cardiology. Since 1983 until today Reiner was leader of several scientific research projects. He is the member of the editorial boards of several international journals such as: Nature Reviews Cardiology, Atherosclerosis (journal), Nutrition, Metabolism & Cardiovascular Diseases and other. In Croatia he edits Liječnički vjesnik (Medical herald). Reiner also reviews world's most famous scientific journals: The Lancet, European Heart Journal, Annals of Medicine, Fundamental and Clinical Pharmacology, European Journal of Preventive Cardiology, Cardiovascular Drugs and Therapy and other. Reiner was in the board of directors of the European Association for Cardiovascular Prevention and Rehabilitation (EACPR) and chairman of the EACPR Committee for Science and guidelines. He is also the founder and longtime president of the Croatian Society for Atherosclerosis, the founder of the Croatian Society of Hypertension, founder and vice president of the Croatian Society for obesity. He was the secretary of the Croatian Medical Association and is a member of the committee for the selection of new Fellows of the Royal Society. Reiner was the first Croat who was the main author of the European guidelines for the treatment of dyslipidaemia published in 2011. He is the coauthor of the European guidelines for cardiovascular disease prevention issued 2007 and 2012. From 1992 to 200 he was chairman of the Croatian Committee for drugs and president of the committee for naming the head doctors. He was also the president of the European Committee for the fight against smoking (2000–2002) and member of the International committee for Léon Bernard Foundation Prize.

From 1995 to 1998, Reiner was member of the executive board of the World Health Organization and was the second Croat to serve as such. Since 2012 he is also one of 6 members of the board at the International Atherosclerosis Society. He is the author of chapters in 30 books and textbooks published in Croatia and abroad, editor of 26 books and manuals, and was the head of several courses at the undergraduate and graduate studies. From 2006 he is the council member at the University of Zagreb. From 1993 to 1998 Reiner was deputy of Minister of Health and Social Welfare, and from 1998 to 2000 Minister.

== Politics ==
Reiner is member of the Croatian Democratic Union. In 2008 he was elected member of the board of Health and Welfare at the Croatian Parliament. From 2011 to 2012 Reiner was vice president of the Committee for Science, Education and Culture at the Croatian Parliament. In Parliament he is also a member of the board for the Interparliamentary Cooperation and deputy member of the delegation in the Parliamentary Dimension of the Central European Initiative.

=== First deputy speakership and tenure as Speaker of Parliament ===
From 2012 until 28 December 2015 Reiner was a Deputy Speaker of the Parliament. On 28 December 2015 he was elected the new Speaker of the Croatian Parliament for its 8th Assembly with 88 votes in favor, 62 abstentions and 1 vote against. He left office on 14 October 2016, when he was succeeded by Božo Petrov. During the same session of Parliament, however, Reiner was once again elected as one of the Deputy Speakers from the ranks of the governing parliamentary majority.

=== Second deputy speakership and temporary assumption of presidential powers and duties ===
In his capacity as a Deputy Speaker of Parliament, Reiner temporarily assumed the powers and duties of the President of Croatia on 11 July 2018 when, due to the rare simultaneous absence of both President Kolinda Grabar-Kitarović, who was attending the 2018 NATO summit in Brussels, and Speaker of Parliament Gordan Jandroković, who (along with Prime Minister Andrej Plenković) was attending the semi-finals of the 2018 World Cup in Moscow, he was left as the highest-ranking official eligible to take up the responsibility. Namely, the Constitution of Croatia allows the President of the Republic to temporarily delegate his or her powers and duties to the Speaker of Parliament during periods of absence, illness or incapacity, while the Speaker himself is likewise authorized by Article 34 of the rule book of Parliament to further delegate his or her own powers and duties to the Deputy Speakers from the parliamentary majority. As the other two eligible Deputy Speakers, Milijan Brkić (HDZ) and Furio Radin (Italian national minority), were both also absent from the country, Reiner was left as the only possible choice to carry out the functions of head of state. Upon Jandroković's return to Croatia the following day, Reiner ceased to carry out the powers and duties of the presidency, which reverted to the Speaker.

== Croatian War of Independence ==
Reiner was a volunteer in the Croatian War of Independence from the early days of its on-set. He was initially both a member and the first deputy commander of the medical headquarters in charge of education and training, and was later commander of the medical personnel. Reiner is a reserve colonel in the Croatian Army.

== Honours ==
Reiner is member of the Academy of Medical Sciences in London. He is a Fellow of the European Society of Cardiology and Fellow of the American College of Cardiology. He is a member of the Academia Europaea.

He has been honored with the following civilian and military awards: Order of Duke Trpimir, Order of Ban Jelačić, Order of Danica Hrvatska, Order of the Croatian Trefoil, Order of the Croatian Interlace, Homeland War Memorial Medal, Medal for Participation in Operation Flash, Medal for Participation in Operation Storm, Medal for Participation in Operation Summer '95 and Memorial Medal "Vukovar". In 2007 Reiner was named honorary citizen of Korčula. He was awarded with the "Ladislav Rakovac Award" and "City of Zagreb Award" in 2011.

Political offices
Preceded by Andrija Hebrang	Minister of Health; 1998–2000	Succeeded by Ana Stavljenić-Rukavina
Preceded by Josip Leko	Speaker of the Croatian Parliament; 2015–2016	Succeeded by Božo Petrov
