= Gabriele Kaminski Schierle =

Swiss academic and scientist

Gabriele Susanne Kaminski Schierle
- Education: University of Fribourg; Lund University
- Scientific career
- Workplaces: University of Cambridge
- Thesis: Apoptosis and excitotoxicity in the death of cultured and grafted dopaminergic neurones (1999)
- Website: https://www.ceb.cam.ac.uk/directory/gabriele-kaminski-schierle

Gabriele Kaminski Schierle is a Austrian academic who is a professor of Molecular Neuroscience at the University of Cambridge. Her research considers the molecular mechanisms that underpin neurodegenerative disease. She was awarded the 2026 British Biophysical Society Sosei Heptares Prize for Biophysics.

== Early life and education ==
Schierle studied biology at the University of Fribourg. She moved to Lund University for her doctorate, where she investigated strategies to increase the survival rate of neurons in the brains of people with Parkinson's disease. Her PhD research was supported by a Marie Curie doctoral fellowship and funding from the Parkinson's Foundation. The neuron transplant was successful. She was supported by a Wellcome Trust Fellowship to move to the University of Cambridge, where she started working on the molecular biology of neurodegenerative disease.

== Research and career ==
Schierle has developed experimental approaches to investigate neurodegenerative disease. In particular, she is interested in the mechanisms that cause proteins to misfold and form aggregates. These aggregates are commonly observed in Alzheimer's disease, Parkinson's disease and Huntington's disease. The aggregation of proteins causes brain cells to shrink and die, and can result in memory loss and personality changes. She has demonstrated that excess calcium in the brain plays a role in Parkinson's disease. Schierle used small sensors (fluorescent polymeric thermometers) to monitor internal cell temperatures (intracellular thermogenesis), and showed that when amyloid-beta aggregates it releases heat that triggers more aggregates to form. She showed that a potential therapeutic target for Alzheimer's disease could be used to prevent aggregation and lower internal cellular temperatures. She used Terahertz spectroscopy to demonstrate that water is critical for whether or not proteins aggregate.

In 2026, Schierle was awarded the British Biophysical Society Sosei Heptares Prize for Biophysics.

== Selected publications ==
- Seema Qamar; GuoZhen Wang; Suzanne J Randle; et al. (2018). "FUS Phase Separation Is Modulated by a Molecular Chaperone and Methylation of Arginine Cation-π Interactions". Cell. 173 (3): 720-734.e15. doi:10.1016/j.cell.2018.03.056. PMC 5927716. PMID 29677515. Wikidata Q52314202.
- Patrik Brundin; Jenny Karlsson; Mia Emgård; Schierle, Gabriele Susanne; Oskar Hansson; Åsa Petersén; Roger F. Castilho (2000). "Improving the survival of grafted dopaminergic neurons: a review over current approaches". Cell Transplantation. 9 (2): 179–195. doi:10.1177/096368970000900205. PMID 10811392. Wikidata Q33918866.
- Schierle, Gabriele Susanne; Hansson, Oskar; Marcel Leist; Pierluigi Nicotera; Håkan Widner; Patrik Brundin (1999). "Caspase inhibition reduces apoptosis and increases survival of nigral transplants". Nature medicine. 5 (1): 97–100. doi:10.1038/4785. PMID 9883846. Wikidata Q48308615.
