= Kouilou =

Kouilou may refer to:

- Kouilou Department, Republic of the Congo
- Kouilou-Niari River, Republic of the Congo
