= Julije =

Julije is a given name. Notable people with the name include:

- Julije Bajamonti (1744–1800), medical historian, writer, translator, encyclopedist, historian, philosopher, and musician from the Croatian city of Split
- Julije Kempf (1864–1934), Croatian historian and writer
- Julije Knifer (1924–2004), Croatian painter and founding member of the prominent 60s Croatian art group known as Gorgona Group
- Julije Makanec (1904–1945), Croatian politician, philosopher and writer
