= Rohit Madhav Sane =

Indian doctor and researcher (born 1977)

- Born: 1 September 1977 (age 49); Maharashtra
- Education: MBBS from Dr. Babasaheb Ambedkar Marathwada University
- Occupations: Medical doctor, clinical researcher
- Known for: preventive cardiology, Cardiac rehabilitation
- Father: Vaidya Madhav Sane

Rohit Madhav Sane is an Indian medical doctor and clinical researcher who is best known for preventive cardiology and Cardiac rehabilitation.

He is the founder of Madhavbaug Clinics and Hospitals and is the chairman and MD of Vaidya Sane Ayurved Laboratories Limited which operates under the Madhavbaug brand and is listed on the National Stock Exchange of India.

Sane is at the National Advisory Board Committee of Swasthya Ayush & Wellness, Government of India.

== Early life and education ==
Rohit Madhav Sane was born on 1 September 1977. His father late Vaidya Madhav Sane was a renowned Ayurvedic practitioner. Sane received MBBS degree at Dr. Babasaheb Ambedkar Marathwada University in 2001 and thereafter completed a fellowship in Cardiac rehabilitation at Apollo Hospitals.

== Career ==
Sane founded Madhavbaug in 2006, inspired by his father late Vaidya Madhav Sane. It was started as an Ayurveda-based cardiac rehabilitation centre in Khopoli, Maharashtra.

Sane has performed preventive care programmes with clinical monitoring for cardiac and metabolic conditions. He has also participated in public awareness activities concerning health screening, diet, physical activity, and stress management.

== Work and research ==
Sane has published 65+ publications. His research includes cardiac rehabilitation, preventive cardiology, and conventional medical care. His h-index is 5 with 120 citations.

In 2017, Sane was the lead author of an open label study involving 70 people with chronic heart failure. The study showed an Ayurveda-based programme as an addition to standard medical treatment.

In 2021, Sane and his co-authors published a study involving 52 people with Ischemia heart disease. The study defined an Ayurveda-based intervention using exercise stress test measures such as the peak oxygen consumption, Duke Treadmill Score and metabolic equivalents.

In 2025, Sane was the lead author of an study of 85 people with reduced ejection fraction and heart failure. The study was a one-week programme that combined Ayurveda therapy with diet and lifestyle changes.

The 2026, a real world cohort study states: 'Cardiometabolic outcomes of the comprehensive diabetes care programme across 16 clinics in Vidharbha'. The study was done by Sane along with Gurudatta Amin, Pravin Ghadigaonkar, and Aniket Kamble.

== Bibliography and podcast ==
- In 2023, Sane created a podcast "Healthy Heart with Dr Rohit Sane" hosted by Dr Aman Kapoor. It has 23 episodes to till date.
- "Role of Vacha Taila Nasya in Neurology"; 2021; P; 234; Prof. Dr. Pandurang Kulkarni; ASIN: B09C8DWLZQ

A book has been written about Sane's life, authored by Sumedh Wadawala.
