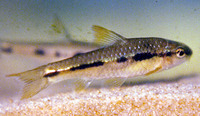
- Photo by the Royal Museum for Central Africa

Conservation status
- Data Deficient (IUCN 3.1)

Scientific classification
- Kingdom: Animalia
- Phylum: Chordata
- Class: Actinopterygii
- Order: Cypriniformes
- Family: Cyprinidae
- Subfamily: Smiliogastrinae
- Genus: Enteromius
- Species: E. catenarius

Binomial name
- Enteromius catenarius Poll & J. G. Lambert, 1959

Synonyms
- Barbus catenarius Poll & Lambert, 1959

= Enteromius catenarius =

Species of fish

Enteromius catenarius is a species of cyprinid fish endemic to the Kouilou-Niari River system of the Republic of the Congo. This species can reach a maximum length of 4.5 centimetres (1.8 in) SL. It is yellow to orange in color and has brown scales. It may be more widespread than currently known but further research is needed.
