= China–Republic of the Congo relations =

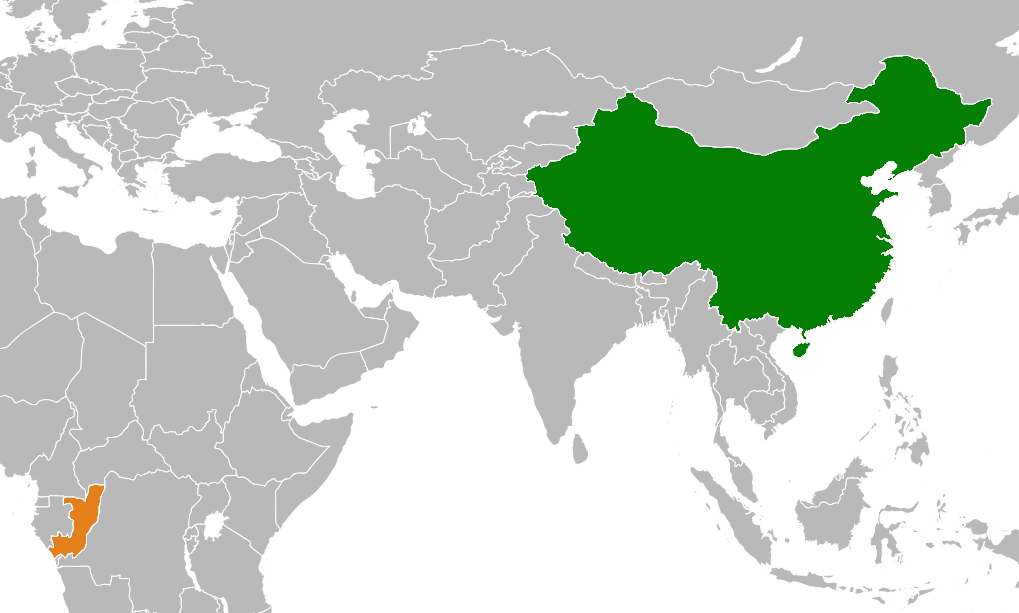
- China: Congo

China–Republic of the Congo relations refer to the bilateral relations between China and Republic of the Congo. On September 10, 1960, Republic of the Congo and the Republic of China (Taiwan) established diplomatic relations. On February 22, 1964, the Republic of Congo switch recognition to the People's Republic of China as the sole legitimate government of China. In 2016, the two countries signed a strategic partnership.

== Aid projects ==
Both China and the Republic of Congo have donated aid projects to each other. The Chinese government fully funded the construction of a EUR 52 million new parliament in the country. The government of the Republic of Congo funded the construction of the China-Congo Friendship Primary School, a school mostly for Tibetan orphans in Chindu County, Qinghai, after the 2010 Yushu earthquake destroyed the old school.

On its 2017 medical mission to Africa, the People's Liberation Army Navy hospital ship Peace Ark traveled to Republic of Congo, where its staff treated 7,508 Congolese patients.

== Economic relations ==
Chinese state owned financial institutions have provided development finance for infrastructure construction in the Republic of Congo.

Beginning in 1974, China helped the Republic of Congo build the Moukoukoulou Dam along the Bouenza River. At the time of its completion in 1979, the dam was the Republic of Congo's largest hydroelectric power source.

Based on media reports, from 2000 to 2012 there were approximately 25 Chinese financed development finance projects in the country. These projects range from building highways linking Brazzaville and Pointe-Noire to constructing the 120-MW Imboulou Dam to supply power to Brazzaville.

There are several large investments by Chinese companies in the Republic of Congo. China Gold is pursuing a copper mining joint venture in the country with the Gerald Group, a US-based metals trading company.

Republic of the Congo joined the Belt and Road Initiative (BRI) in 2018.

== Political relations ==
The Republic of the Congo follows the one China principle. It recognizes the People's Republic of China as the sole government of China and Taiwan as an integral part of China's territory, and supports all efforts by the PRC to "achieve national reunification". It also considers Hong Kong, Xinjiang and Tibet to be China's internal affairs.

In July 2019, UN ambassadors of 37 countries, including the Republic of the Congo, signed a joint letter to the United Nations Human Rights Council defending China's persecution of Uyghurs. The Republic of the Congo was one of 16 countries that defended China in 2019 but did not do so in 2020. Republic of the Congo was one of 53 countries, that in June 2020, backed the Hong Kong national security law at the United Nations.
