= Srđ je Grad =

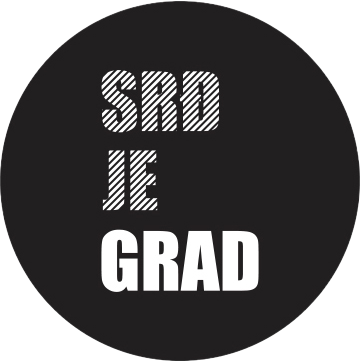
- Founded: 14 December 2020
- Merged into: We Can!
- Headquarters: Dubrovnik
- Dubrovnik City Council: 3 / 21
- Assembly of Dubrovnik-Neretva County: 2 / 37

Website
- https://www.srdjegrad.hr/srd-je-grad

Srđ je Grad (lit. 'Srđ is the City') is a political party from Dubrovnik, Croatia, officially founded in 2021 as a continuation of a local civic initiative of the same name.

== History ==
The civic initiative Srđ je Grad was formed in 2010 in response to plans to build a golf course on Mount Srđ above Dubrovnik. The initiative brought together citizens who opposed urbanization of the area, viewing it as harmful to the environment and contrary to public interest. After years of activism, the initiative transformed into a political party at its founding assembly on 24 October 2020 and was officially registered on 14 December 2020. In 2021, the party joined the We Can! platform.

== Organization ==
According to its statute, the party is led by two coordinators and a nine-member governing board. Coordinators and board members are elected at the party assembly for two-year terms.

== Coalitions and elections ==
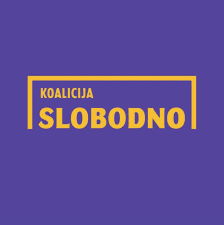
The Slobodno coalition

In the 2021 Croatian local elections, Srđ je Grad joined the green-left coalition led by the We Can! platform.

In the 2025 Croatian local elections, Srđ je Grad joined the "Slobodno" coalition together with the SDP and We Can!. The party advanced to the second round of the Dubrovnik mayoral race with joint candidate Anita Bonačić Obradović, but she was defeated by the HDZ candidate Mato Franković. In the Dubrovnik City Council, the party won three seats.

In the election for the Assembly of Dubrovnik-Neretva County, the same coalition won eight seats with 22.30% (11,704) votes. Of those, Srđ je Grad received two seats, We Can! one seat, and SDP five seats.
