= Robert Podolnjak =

Croatian associate professor of constitutional law and politician

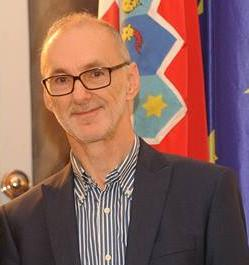

Member of the Croatian Parliament for III electoral district
- Incumbent
- Assumed office 26 January 2016

Chairman of the Committee on the Constitution, Standing Orders and Political System of the Croatian Parliament (Two terms)
- In office 26 January 2016 – June 2017
- President: Kolinda Grabar-Kitarović
- Prime Minister: Tihomir Orešković (2016); Andrej Plenković (2016–2017)
- Preceded by: Peđa Grbin
- Succeeded by: Željko Reiner

Deputy speaker of the Croatian Parliament
- In office 28 December 2015 – 14 October 2016

Personal details
- Born: Robert Jovanović; 3 June 1958 (age 68) Varaždin, Yugoslavia (now Croatia)
- Party: Croatian Peasant Party (before 2010); Independent (2010–2016); Bridge of Independent Lists (2016–present)
- Spouse: Iva Podolnjak
- Children: 1
- Education: University of Zagreb
- Occupation: University professor, politician
- Profession: Political scientist

Robert Podolnjak (born 3 June 1958) is a Croatian associate professor of constitutional law and politician who served as chairman of the Croatian Parliament's Committee on the Constitution, Standing Orders and Political System between January 2016 and June 2017. Podolnjak was elected to the Croatian Parliament at the 2015 and 2016 parliamentary elections as representative for III electoral district. He is member of the Bridge of Independent Lists party.

== Early life and education ==
Robert Podolnjak was born in Varaždin on June 3, 1958. Until 1992 he had Serbian surname Jovanović, which he changed to his mother's because his wife was pregnant with their first child during period of the Croatian War of Independence (1991-1995), so they did not want their child to bear the surname to which many then tied negative connotations. As he later explained, his father Vjekoslav (b. 1933) and grandfather Ivan identified themselves on the censuses as Croats and Catholics which had Serbian (Orthodox) surname because Podolnjak's grandfather, who lived in Sremska Mitrovica, was adopted by a man with that surname. His grandfather Ivan Jovanović was executed in late 1944 by the Yugoslav Partisans because he was a guard in Sremska Mitrovica jail so Partisans suspected him of collaboration witch Nazi and Ustaše occupiers.

Podolnjak finished elementary and high school in Varaždin, after which he enrolled in Zagreb Faculty of Political Sciences from which he graduated in 1981. He gained his master's degree in 1991 from the same Faculty, and PhD in 2001 from the Zagreb Faculty of Law.

== Career ==
Robert Podolnjak got his first job in 1985 when he started worked as an adviser and secretary in the government of the City of Varaždin. At that time, he became a close associate of mayor Ivan Čehok (HSLS). In 2006, Podolnjak resigned because he got a job at the Chair of Constitutional Law of the Zagreb Faculty of Law where he still works as associate professor.

At 2009 local elections, Podolnjak ran as a HSS's candidate for mayor of Varaždin but lost which led to his resignation from party membership. At 2011 Varaždin local elections, he supported Ladislav Ilčić, Croatian Growth party candidate for mayor, as an independent candidate for his deputy. They lost the election so their cooperation ended. After 2013 local elections, Podolnjak entered Varaždin City Council as an independent.

In 2013, he became a member of a team of constitutional experts of the President Ivo Josipović who were supposed to draw up a draft of amendment to the Croatian Constitution which would introduce a number of changes that Josipović proposed as a platform for his campaign for 2014–15 presidential election. In the next year, Podolnjak was a legal adviser of conservative NGO In the Name of the Family about the constitutional aspects of the referendum on the change of electoral system which was proposed by the NGO.

In October 2015, he agreed to be a candidate of Bridge of Independent Lists party (MOST) in the III electoral district on 2015 parliamentary election, because, as he stated, they haven't demanded him to join the party, while they were willing to let him focus on defining MOST's policy on local government and referendum initiatives. At the elections, he won 4.681 preferential votes, and has become member of the Croatian Parliament. On the first, constitutional, session of the 8th Parliament assembly, 55 MP's nominated Podolnjak for the position of the Parliament's Speaker but he refused nomination because he didn't have support of the Croatian Democratic Union (HDZ), and since it is a custom that the Speaker is elected unanimously. He was eventually elected Deputy speaker and Chairman of the Committee on the Constitution, Standing Orders and Political System of the Croatian Parliament. On 2016 parliamentary election, he was re-elected to the Parliament and later to the position of the chairman of the Committee on the Constitution, Standing Orders and Political System with the support from HDZ and SDSS. After Bridge of Independent Lists decided to leave Cabinet of Andrej Plenković and therefore move to the opposition, Podolnjak was replaced as the Committee's chairmen by academician Željko Reiner (HDZ).

== Political party membership ==
Podolnjak is a member of Bridge of Independent Lists since 2016. First party he joined was Croatian Peasant Party which he left due to poor election results. He worked closely with liberal Croatian Social Liberal Party and Croatian People's Party, as well as with conservative Croatian Growth party.

== Memberships in organisations ==
Podolnjak is a full member of the Academy of Legal Sciences of Croatia, the Croatian Constitutional Law Association, the International Association of Constitutional Law (IACL) and the Croatian Political Science Association.

== Private life ==
Podolnjak is married to Iva Podolnjak with whom he has one daughter. He resides in Varaždin.

== Publications ==
Podolnjak has published three scientific monographs, and more than 70 papers in scientific journals, proceedings and other publications.

- "Federalizam i republikanizam: Stvaranje američkog ustava” (Federalism and Republicanism: The creation of the US Constitution), 2004
- "Neposredan izbor (grado)načelnika i župana: Europska iskustva i hrvatski izazov" ("Direct election of city mayors, municipality mayors and county prefects: European experience and Croatian challenge), 2005
- "(Grado)načelnik i vijeće: Novi institucionalni okvir hrvatske lokalne samouprave u komparativnoj perspektivi" (City and municipality mayor, and the council: New institutional framework of the Croatian local government in comparative perspective), 2010
