= Cardiac rehabilitation =

Model of health care

Cardiac rehabilitation (CR) is defined by the World Health Organization (WHO) as "the sum of activity and interventions required to ensure the best possible physical, mental, and social conditions so that patients with chronic or post-acute cardiovascular disease may, by their own efforts, preserve or resume their proper place in society and lead an active life". CR is a comprehensive model of care delivering a wide range of established health interventions, including structured exercise, patient education, psychosocial counseling, risk factor reduction, and behavior modification, with a goal of improving patient's quality of life and reducing the risk of future heart problems.

CR is delivered by a multi-disciplinary team, often headed by a physician such as a cardiologist. Nurses support patients in reducing medical risk factors such as high blood pressure, high cholesterol and diabetes. Physiotherapists or other exercise professionals develop an individualized and structured exercise plan, including resistance training. A dietitian helps create a healthy eating plan. A social worker or psychologist may help patients to alleviate stress and address any identified psychological conditions; for tobacco users, they can offer counseling or recommend other proven treatments to support patients in their efforts to quit. Support for return-to-work can also be provided. CR programs are patient-centered.

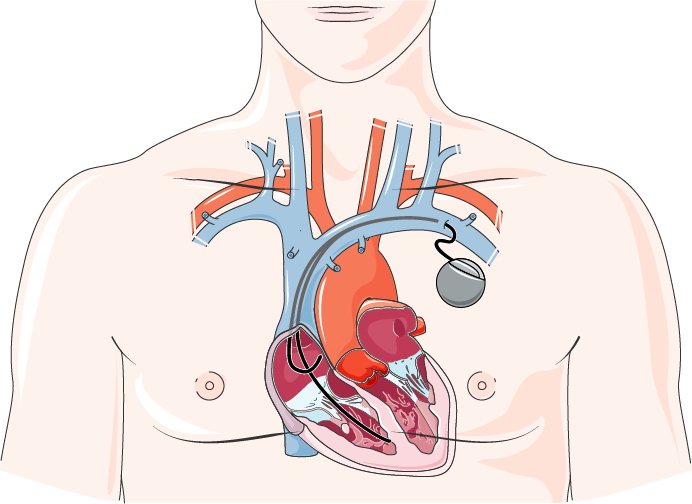
Medical illustration of a human heart that is being assisted by a pacemaker.

Based on the benefits summarized below, CR programs are recommended by the American Heart Association / American College of Cardiology and the European Society of Cardiology, among other associations. Patients typically enter CR in the weeks following an acute coronary event such as a myocardial infarction (heart attack), with a diagnosis of heart failure, or following percutaneous coronary intervention (such as coronary stent placement), coronary artery bypass surgery, a valve procedure, or insertion of a rhythm device (e.g., pacemaker, implantable cardioverter defibrillator). However, some populations, including women and older patients, are less likely than others to seek out and complete these types of programs.

== Settings ==
CR services can be provided in hospital, in an outpatient setting such as a community center, or remotely at home using the phone and other technologies. Hybrid programs are also increasingly being offered. There appears to be no difference in outcomes between supervised and home-based CR programs, and both cost about the same. Home-based cardiac rehabilitation is generally considered to be a safe alternative to traditional CR. Home-based programs with technology are similarly shown to be effective. In a typical cardiac rehabilitation setting, the patient is cared for by a team of professionals that is typically led by a cardiologist. In home-based cardiac rehabilitation programs, patients are supported by a similar team of professionals, but the patient is responsible for completing the program without direct supervision. While CR is generally considered to be cost effective, it is worth noting that many insurances, including Medicare, do not cover home-based cardiac rehabilitation programs

== Lifelong cardiovascular health ==
In 2026, the World Heart Federation (WHF) published a Roadmap on Cardiac Rehabilitation: A Pathway to Lifelong Cardiovascular Health in Nature Reviews Cardiology, which proposed reframing cardiac rehabilitation from a time-limited programme following a cardiovascular event towards a more continuous, person-centred approach to secondary prevention and lifelong cardiovascular health.

The Roadmap identifies five interrelated roadblocks to effective cardiovascular rehabilitation and proposes corresponding areas for action: increasing the emphasis on lifelong cardiovascular health; improving patient and clinician engagement; expanding flexible and contemporary models of care; strengthening the cardiovascular rehabilitation workforce; and advancing advocacy and supportive health policy.

These recommendations build on a framework of five organisational areas, referred to as the “5 Ps”, for reframing cardiac rehabilitation: personalization, processes and systems, patient-centred care, parlance, and partnership and unity.

A corresponding implementation paper published in Global Heart describes strategies for applying the Roadmap across different health-care settings. These include embedding cardiovascular rehabilitation throughout the continuum of care, improving referral and engagement, using flexible and personalised models of care, strengthening workforce capacity, using data for quality improvement, and aligning funding and policy mechanisms to support sustainable delivery.

In 2026, a Global Symposium has been convened by SOLVE-CHD and will pursue unity, advocacy and implementation of the roadmap.

== Uses and requirements ==
CR is useful for those who are recovering from a recent cardiac emergency, those who need assistance managing their chronic stable angina symptoms, those who have recently undergone cardiac surgeries, and in many other cases. Exercise-based cardiac rehabilitation for people with coronary heart disease improves outcomes, including reducing the risk of myocardial infarction and hospitalisation and improving health-related quality of life. However, traditional CR is not an option for some individuals. Some patients are discouraged from participating in the typical exercise component of CR, including those with unstable angina, intracavitary thrombus, and more.

== Cardiac rehabilitation phases ==
=== Inpatient program (phase I) ===
Engaging in CR before leaving the hospital can hasten patient's recovery, as well as facilitate a smoother return to activities of daily living and roles once they return home. Many patients express anxiety about their recovery, especially after a severe illness or surgery, so Phase I CR provides an opportunity for patients to test their abilities in a safe, supervised setting.

Where available, patients receiving CR in the hospital after surgery are usually able to begin within a day or two. First steps include simple motion exercises that can be done sitting down, such as lifting the arms. Heart rate and blood oxygen levels are closely monitored by a therapist as the patient begins to walk, or exercise using a stationary bicycle. The therapist ensures that the level of aerobic and strength training are appropriate for the patient's current status, and gradually progresses their therapeutic exercises.

Phase I is also an ideal time for the patient and their family to receive information regarding what is to be expected after their release. This includes information regarding their ADLs (activities of daily life) and the importance of stress management. During this time, patients are also assessed to determine if they will need assistive devices following their release from the inpatient program.

=== Outpatient program (phase II) ===
In order to participate in an outpatient program, the patient generally must first obtain a physician's referral. It is recommended patients begin outpatient CR within 2–7 days following a percutaneous intervention, and 4–6 weeks after cardiac surgery. This period is often very difficult for patients due to fears of over-exertion or a recurrence of heart issues. Shorter time to start is associated with better outcomes.

Participation typically begins with an intake evaluation that includes measurement of cardiac risk factors such as lipids, blood pressure, body composition, depression / anxiety, and tobacco use. A functional capacity test is usually performed both to determine if exercise is safe and to support development of a customized exercise program.

Risk factors are addressed and patients goals are established; a "case-manager" who may be a cardiac-trained registered nurse, physiotherapist, or an exercise physiologist works to help patients achieve their targets. During exercise, the patient's heart rate and blood pressure may be monitored to check the intensity of activity.

The duration of CR varies from program to program, and can range from six weeks to several years. Globally, a median of 24 sessions are offered, and it is well-established that the more the better.

=== Post-Cardiac Rehabilitation (phase III) ===
Immediately following phase II, patients are encouraged to continue their recovery from home. While it is recommended that patients continue to attend follow-up visits with their physicians, phase III is predominantly carried out by the patients themselves. During this phase, the patient is expected to continue taking their medications as prescribed, to continue the exercises that they have been taught, and to ensure that they make the appropriate lifestyle changes to avoid another cardiac event. Challenges persist for optimizing and maintaining cardiovascular health among people with CVD and this includes a need for longer-term support and care rather than a time-limited traditional rehabilitation program.

== Benefits ==
Participation in CR may be associated with many benefits. Cardiac rehabilitation decreases the risk that patients will have further complications due to heart disease, with studies showing that CR decreases the chance of dying from heart complications in the next five years by about 35%. The potential benefit in all-cause mortality is not as clear, however there is some supportive evidence.

CR is associated with improved quality of life, improved psychosocial well-being, and functional capacity, and is cost-effective. Cardiac rehabilitation has also been shown to improve physical activity levels. A systematic review and meta-analysis of randomized controlled trials found evidence that individuals who participate in cardiac rehabilitation through physical therapy tend to have higher levels of physical activity compared to those who do not. In addition, cardiac rehabilitation has been shown to reduce negative symptoms, help foster positive lifestyle changes, and encourage patients to continue taking their medications on a daily basis. There are specific reviews on benefits of CR in patients with specific health conditions such as valve issues, atrial fibrillation, heart transplant recipients, and heart failure.

While CR is generally considered safe and effective, there are rare cases in which patients undergoing cardiac rehabilitation experience physical complications as they complete the exercise aspect of these programs.

== Psychological health and cardiac rehabilitation ==
Poor psychological health has been shown to have a negative impact on patients' recovery process as well as their willingness and ability to complete rehabilitation. Unresolved depression and anxiety have also been shown to increase the risk of mortality following the completion of rehabilitation programs. Because of this, psychological intervention is a common practice in CR.

Additionally, research suggests that screening for psychological distress is a helpful way to assess a patient's risk of further cardiovascular complications due to the negative effects of psychological distress on CVD outcomes. However, this type of psychological health screening is still underutilized in modern cardiac rehabilitation programs.

== Under-use of cardiac rehabilitation ==
CR is significantly under-used globally. Rates vary widely.

Under-use is caused by multi-level factors. At the health system level, this includes lack of available programs. At the provider level, low referral rates are a major barrier. At the patient level, factors such as lack of awareness, transportation, distance, cost, competing responsibilities, and other health conditions are responsible, but most can be mitigated. Women, ethnocultural minorities, older patients, those of lower socio-economic status, with comorbidities, and living in rural areas are less likely to access CR, despite the fact that these patients often need it most.

Several strategies have been described to reduce barriers to cardiac rehabilitation use, including automatic or electronic referral systems from inpatient units and promotion of CR by healthcare providers at the bedside.

Training more healthcare professionals to deliver CR can also help. CR programs can also join a registry to assess and improve their utilization—among other quality indicators. Offering programs tailored to under-served groups such as women may also facilitate program participation. Global experts have proposed the 5 P's for umproving quality and uptake of cardiac rehabilitation programs as follows (1) personalization, (2) processes and systems, (3) patient-centered care, (4) parlance, and (5) partnership and unity. United groups are driving new approaches and data driven-approaches to care such as SOLVE-CHD.

== Cardiac rehabilitation societies ==
CR professionals work together in many countries to optimize service delivery and increase awareness of CR. The International Council of Cardiovascular Prevention and Rehabilitation (ICCPR), a member of the World Heart Federation, is composed of formally-named Board members of CR societies globally. Through cooperation across most CR-related associations, ICCPR seeks to promote CR in low-resource settings, among other aims outlined in their Charter. CR societies offer registries, clinician certification, and program certification, among other resources.
