= Chinedum Okwudire =

American academic in the field of engineering

Chinedum ("Chi") Okwudire
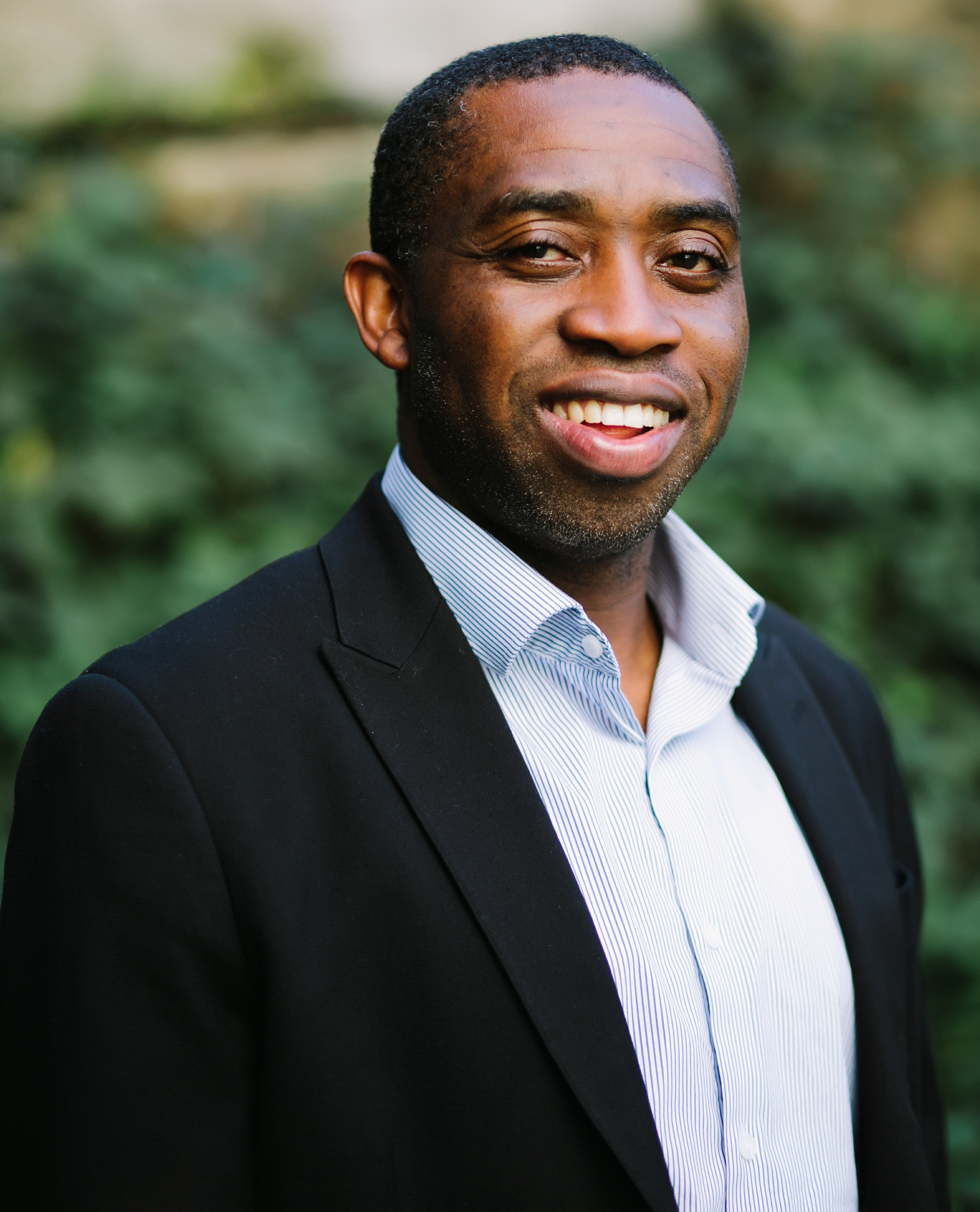
- Born: 1980 (age 45–46); Jos, Nigeria
- Education: Middle East Technical University (B.Sc.); University of British Columbia (MA.Sc., Ph.D.)
- Awards: National Science Foundation CAREER Award International Symposium on Flexible Automation (ISFA) Young Investigator Award SAE Ralph Teetor Educational Award SME Outstanding Young Manufacturing Engineer Award ASME Best Conference Paper on Mechatronics Award Russell Severance Springer Visiting Professor at UC Berkeley Recognized by SME as one of the 25 Leaders Transforming Manufacturing University of Michigan's Miller Faculty Scholar Award
- Scientific career
- Fields: Manufacturing Automation, Control Engineering, Mechatronics
- Workplaces: University of Michigan
- Doctoral advisor: Yusuf Altintas

Chinedum ("Chi") Okwudire is a Nigerian-American mechanical engineer, manufacturing researcher, educator, and entrepreneur. He is a professor of mechanical engineering at the University of Michigan and director of the University of Michigan Advanced Manufacturing Institute (UMAMI). His research focuses on manufacturing automation, mechatronics, smart manufacturing, robotics, and additive manufacturing.

Okwudire is known for contributions to software-based vibration compensation and control methods for high-speed 3D printing systems, as well as intelligent scan optimization methods for metal additive manufacturing. He is the founder of Ulendo Technologies, Inc., a company developing software for industrial additive manufacturing and manufacturing automation.

== Education ==
Okwudire received a Bachelor of Science degree in mechanical engineering from Middle East Technical University in 2003. He subsequently completed graduate studies at the University of British Columbia, earning a Master of Applied Science degree in 2005 and a Ph.D. in 2009, both in mechanical engineering. His doctoral research focused on the modeling and control of feed-drive systems for high-speed machine tools.

== Career ==
After receiving his doctorate in 2009, Okwudire joined DMG Mori Seiki Co. in 2010 as a senior mechanical engineer and leader of the mechatronic systems optimization team before joining the faculty of the University of Michigan in 2011 as an assistant professor. He was promoted to associate professor in 2017 and to full professor in 2023. From 2019 to 2021, he served as associate chair of Integrative Systems + Design (ISD) at the University of Michigan. In 2026, he became the director of the University of Michigan Advanced Manufacturing Institute (UMAMI).

Okwudire's expertise lies in manufacturing automation, control engineering, and mechatronics, with key applications to additive manufacturing (3D printing), nano-positioning, machining, distributed manufacturing, and smart manufacturing systems. He directs the Smart and Sustainable Automation Research Lab at the University of Michigan, which seeks to exploit knowledge at the intersection of machine design, control, and computing to boost the performance of manufacturing automation systems at low cost.

== Research and Contributions ==
Okwudire is known for research on software-based vibration compensation methods for manufacturing machines, particularly fused filament fabrication (FFF) 3D printers. Research from his laboratory at the University of Michigan demonstrated methods for significantly increasing 3D-printing speed while maintaining dimensional accuracy and print quality through software-based control approaches. His group's work helped popularize vibration compensation as an important tool for high-speed material-extrusion additive manufacturing.

His research explored motion-control approaches (specifically, filtered B-splines (FBS)) to reduce vibration-induced printing defects in high-speed 3D printers. Work from his laboratory also influenced broader adoption of vibration-compensation techniques within open-source 3D-printing firmware ecosystems, including Klipper firmware and Marlin firmware. Through Ulendo Technologies, software implementing FBS-based vibration compensation was commercialized as part of the company's motion-control products for additive manufacturing systems.

Beyond material-extrusion printing, Okwudire's research has focused on intelligent control and optimization methods for metal additive manufacturing processes such as laser powder bed fusion (LPBF). His research group developed "SmartScan," an intelligent scan-sequence optimization method intended to reduce residual stress, overheating, and part deformation during metal additive manufacturing.

His broader research contributions span manufacturing automation, mechatronics, robotics, digital manufacturing, and smart manufacturing systems, with applications in precision machining, semiconductor manufacturing equipment, and distributed manufacturing.

In recognition of his contributions to manufacturing research and entrepreneurship, SME named Okwudire one of its "25 Leaders Transforming Manufacturing" in 2022.

== Leadership and Public Service ==
Okwudire has served on multiple national committees and advisory panels related to advanced manufacturing, manufacturing education, robotics, and industrial policy in the United States. In 2026, he assumed the role of director of the University of Michigan Advanced Manufacturing Institute (UMAMI), an interdisciplinary institute focused on advancing research, education, workforce development, and industrial collaboration in advanced manufacturing.

He has participated in studies and committees organized by the National Academies of Sciences, Engineering, and Medicine (NASEM), including those focused on smart manufacturing and advanced manufacturing workforce development. These efforts have examined issues related to manufacturing competitiveness, technology adoption, and the future of manufacturing education in the United States. Okwudire also served on a science and technology accelerator study panel organized by The Minerals, Metals & Materials Society (TMS) focused on the integration of robotics, artificial intelligence, and digital technologies into manufacturing systems.

In 2026, he was appointed to the Special Competitive Studies Project (SCSP) National Security Commission on Robotics for Advanced Manufacturing, a commission established to examine the role of robotics and advanced manufacturing technologies in U.S. industrial competitiveness and national security.

== Teaching and Mentorship ==
At the University of Michigan, Okwudire co-led the development of courses in smart manufacturing and additive manufacturing that have earned national recognition. In 2025, he also led the creation of the online course Introduction to 3D Printing with Metals on Coursera in partnership with Siemens and the University of Michigan Center for Academic Innovation. The course was designed to broaden access to education in metal additive manufacturing through online instruction, interviews with industry experts, and augmented reality learning experiences.

Okwudire is also a strong champion for diversity, equity, and inclusion in the academe. In 2018, he and Professor Lola Eniola-Adefeso, co-established the NextProf Pathfinder Workshop, a future-faculty program specifically aimed at first- and second-year PhD students, rather than final year PhD students and postdoctoral fellows, as is typical in many other institutions. The goal of the Pathfinder workshop is to equip attendees with the knowledge and skills needed to develop strong CVs early in their PhD process, making them competitive for faculty positions. The NextProf Pathfinder program has now expanded to include the University of California, San Diego, and the Georgia Institute of Technology.

== Awards ==
- National Science Foundation CAREER Award, 2014
- Frontiers of Engineering Education Symposium Invitee, National Academy of Engineering, 2014
- Best Oral Paper Award, American Society for Precision Engineering, 2015
- International Symposium on Flexible Automation (ISFA) Young Investigator Award, 2016
- SAE Ralph Teetor Educational Award, 2016
- SME (formerly, Society of Manufacturing Engineers) Outstanding Young Manufacturing Engineer Award, 2016
- University of Michigan's North Campus MLK Spirit Award, 2017
- ASME Best Conference Paper on Mechatronics Award, 2017
- University of Michigan's Mechanical Engineering Department Achievement Award, 2017
- Russell Severance Springer Visiting Professor at UC Berkeley, 2018
- University of Michigan's Harold R. Johnson Diversity Service Award, 2019
- University of Michigan's Integrative Systems and Design (ISD) Distinguished Faculty Award, 2022
- IEEE/ASME Transactions on Mechatronics Best Transaction Paper Award Finalist, 2021
- Distinguished International Visiting Scholar Award, University of Waterloo, 2020
- University of Michigan's Raymond J. and Monica E. Schultz Outreach and Diversity Award, 2020
- IEEE/ASME Conference on Advanced Intelligent Mechatronics Best Paper Award, 2022
- Recognized by SME as one of the 25 Leaders Transforming Manufacturing, 2022
- University of Michigan's Miller Faculty Scholar Award, 2022
- University of Michigan's Robert M. Caddell Memorial Awards for Research, 2023
- Fellow of the American Society of Mechanical Engineers (ASME), 2023
- SME Education Award, 2024
- Rexford E. Hall Innovation Excellence Award, University of Michigan, 2025

== Selected publications ==
- Ramani, Keval S., Chuan He, Yueh-Lin Tsai, and Chinedum E. Okwudire. "SmartScan: An intelligent scanning approach for uniform thermal distribution, reduced residual stresses and deformations in PBF additive manufacturing." Additive Manufacturing 52 (2022): 102643.
- Okwudire, Chinedum E., and Harsha V. Madhyastha. "Distributed manufacturing for and by the masses." Science 372, no. 6540 (2021): 341–342.
- Duan, Molong, Deokkyun Yoon, and Chinedum E. Okwudire. "A limited-preview filtered B-spline approach to tracking control–With application to vibration-induced error compensation of a 3D printer." Mechatronics 56 (2018): 287–296.
