= Moukoukoulou Dam =

- Location within Republic of the Congo
- Country: Republic of the Congo
- Coordinates: 3.898632°S 13.765215°E
- Purpose: Hydroelectricity
- Owner: Energie Electrique du Congo

Dam and spillways
- Impounds: Bouenza River
- Spillways: 1
- Spillway type: Free

Reservoir
- Creates: none

Moukoukoulou Hydroelectric Power Plant
- Coordinates: 3.901033°S 13.765199°E
- Operator: Energie Electrique du Congo
- Commission date: 1979
- Hydraulic head: 68 metres (223 ft)
- Turbines: 4 x 18.5 MW
- Installed capacity: 74 MW
- 1985 generation: 400 GWh

The Moukoukoulou Dam is a hydroelectric dam on the Bouenza River in the Republic of the Congo, built by Chinese technicians and commissioned in 1979 to supply energy to Pointe-Noire. It is the main source of power to the south of the country. Due to fluctuating water levels and to poor maintenance of the plant and transmission network it often delivers far less than its nominal 74 megawatts.

== Technical ==
The Moukoukoulou hydroelectric power station includes a concrete dam with a free spillway, a water intake fitted with fine grids, head valves, supply and penstock pipes, a plant and an outdoor station. The nominal drop height is 68 metres (223 ft). The power plant has four 18.5 megawatt turbine/generator sets, giving total power of 74 megawatts. There are two 45 megavolt-ampere transformers, with two sets per transformer. The output voltage is 11 kilovolts and discharge voltage is 110 kilovolts. The electricity is fed into the transmission network which includes 110 kV transformer stations at Bouenza Il, Nkayi and Loudima, and 35 kV transformer stations at Loutété, Madingou and Dolisie.

In 1985 the plant had a maximum energy output of 400 GWh/year, but only half of that was being absorbed by the network due to lack of a connection to Brazzaville. About 240 GWh was generated in the wet season, and 160 GWh in the dry season. During the low water period of June, July and August the guaranteed power output is no more than 30 MW. A 2004 report recommended creation of a water retention structure to guarantee full power output throughout the year.

== History ==
The Moukoukoulou hydroelectric power plant is the most important in the country. Construction started under the presidency of Marien Ngouabi within the Sino-Congolese cooperation framework. The dam was built by Chinese technicians in 1974. The power plant was commissioned in 1979. At completion, it became the Republic of Congo's largest hydroelectric power source.

A 1988 UNDP / World Bank report noted that the Moukoukoulou power plant was in a deteriorating condition. A single 225 kW/110 kV line linked Moukoukoulou to Pointe-Noire, so that city was vulnerable to power failures. The Société Nationale d'Electricité (SNE) had two independent networks, one centered on Brazzaville and the other on Pointe-Noire. A 225 kV line linking the networks was expected to be operational by late 1988. This would allowing surplus capacity from Moukoukoulou to be directed to Brazzaville and reduce the need for imports from Zaire. Extensive work was needed at Moukoukoulou on the ancillary equipment and other problems had to be resolved to improve output and reliability.

In April 1998 Cocoye insurgents captured the Moukoukoulou Hydroelectric Dam, killing several employees and cutting off the electric supply to Pointe-Noire for several weeks. The plant was damaged, and since then only provided 25 MW. In April 2002 a mutiny by 21 government troops demanding payment of their salaries led to power being cut from the Moukoukoulou dam. This caused an electricity blackout in the south of the country. On 2 May 2002 the troops were dismissed from the army.

A 2005 OECD report noted that during the civil war the hydroelectric plants had been badly damaged, and there were severe shortages of water and electricity. The equipment of the SNE was decrepit and operating at only 1/3 of its capacity. Repairs to the high-voltage line between Moukoukoulou and Brazzaville were expected to start soon.

In May 2007 President Denis Sassou Nguesso visited Moukoukoulou, where all four turbine generators had been rehabilitated at a cost of US$12 million, although work on the transformers was still not complete. Damage to the transmission network was preventing its power from reaching Brazzaville, which was relying on power from the Inga plants in the Democratic Republic of Congo. The rehabilitation work was carried out by Chinese technicians with funding of 6 billion CFA francs from the Congolese government.

In 2017 the SNE president Eugène Ondzambe Ngoyi asked the government to fund a general overhaul of the equipment at Moukoukoulou. Since 1979 there had been only three general overhauls in 34 years, although the recommended frequency was every four years. On 29 July 2018 the SNE was dissolved and its assets and staff were transferred to the new limited company Energie Electrique du Congo (E2C). In October 2018 the Ministry of Energy and Hydraulics invited expressions of interest from private companies to rehabilitate, modernize and operate the Moukoukoulou hydroelectric power station.

== Sources ==
- Bissila, A. (22 July 2016), Le barrage de Moukoukoulou (Bouendza), CERBAC : Centre d'Etudes et de Recherches du Bassin du Congo
- Congo: Issues and Options in the Energy Sector (PDF), UNDP / World Bank, January 1988
- "Congo Republic" (PDF), African Economic Outlook, OECD, 2005
- "Congo Republic restores 74-MW Moukoukoulou", Hydro Review, 7 May 2007
- Historique, Energie Electrique du Congo, E2C
- Kissinger, Edwige (5 May 2017), "La direction de la SNE demande au gouvernement de réhabiliter le barrage hydroélectrique de Moukoukoulou", Les Echos du Congo, Brazzaville
- Moukoukoulou, Energie Electrique du Congo, E2C
- Projet PRC 98 / G31 Habilitation du Congo et Inventaire des Gaz à Effet de Serre (PDF), Republic of the Congo, October 2004
- Réhabilitation, la modernisation et l'exploitation de la centrale hydroélectrique de Moukoukoulou, Dobiza, 26 October 2018
- "Republic of Congo Civil War", Global Security
- The Republic of Congo (Brazzaville) Country Assessment (PDF), Home Office, United Kingdom, April 2003
