= Dragutin Lerman =

Croatian explorer

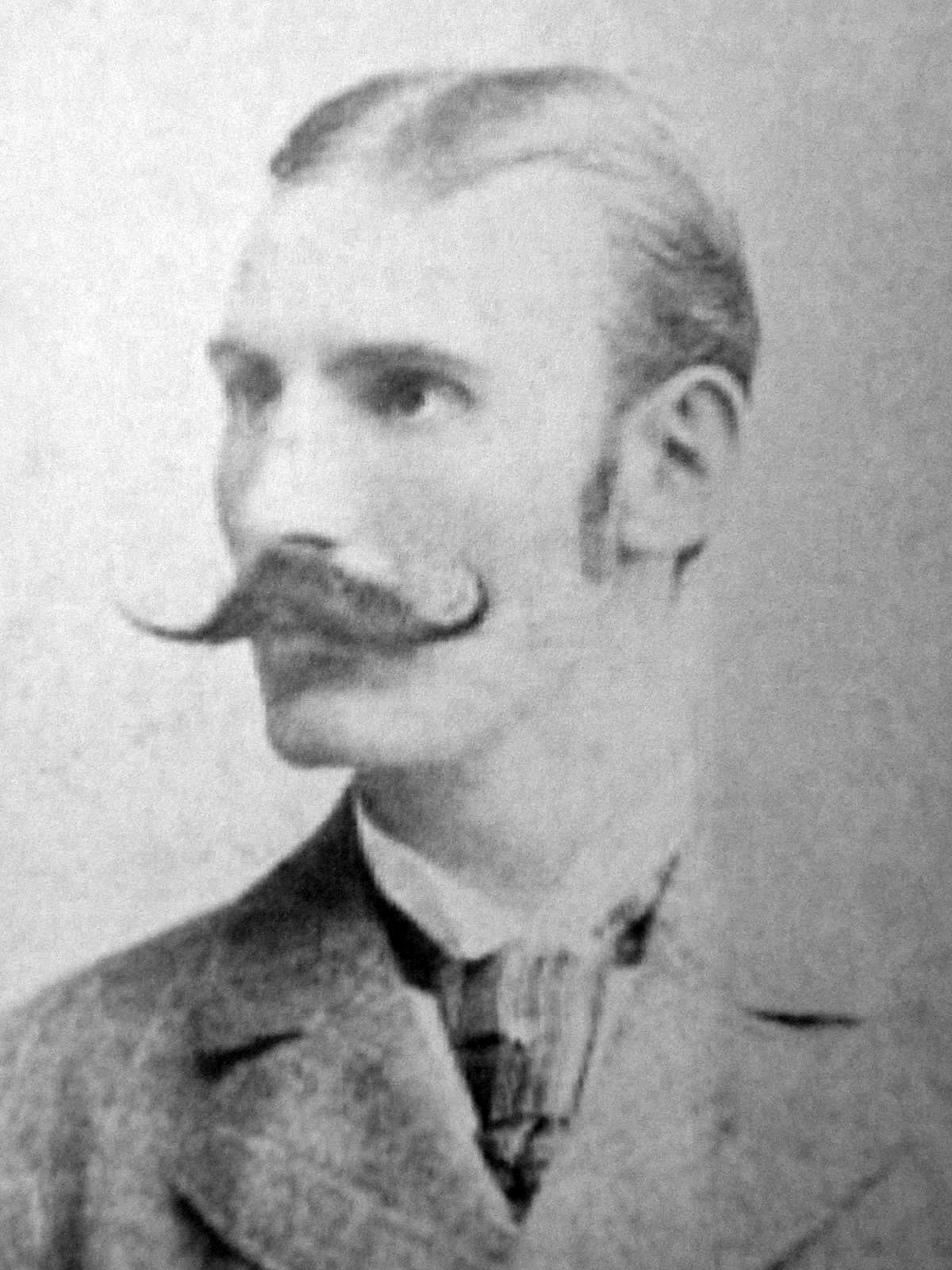
- Born: 24 August 1863; Požega, Kingdom of Slavonia, Austrian Empire
- Died: 12 July 1918 (aged 54); Kreševo, Condominium of Bosnia and Herzegovina, Austria-Hungary
- Occupation: Explorer of Africa
- Known for: Discovery of the Zrinski chutes
- Relatives: Željko Reiner (great-nephew)

Dragutin Lerman (24 August 1863 – 12 July 1918) was a Croatian explorer.

== Biography ==
Lerman was born in Požega, Slavonia, but he left his home very early. He was a member of the 1882 Henry Morton Stanley expedition to Congo and was one of Stanley's most trusted men. ("The Croat is energetic, cautious, in high spirits...")

Later, he was the confidant of Leopold II of Belgium and the very representative of the Belgian government in the Congo. His first exploration trip lasted from 1882 to 1885, the second from 1888 to 1890, and the third between 1892 and 1894. The fourth lasted six months during 1896. During the journey through Congo in 1882, he discovered huge waterfalls on the Kouilou River, (or Kwil), and named them the Zrinski chutes to honor the national family of rulers (Nikola Zrinski and Petar Zrinski of Međimurje) from his native country.

His diary was transferred into two books. The first, published in 1891 under the title Dnevnik iz Afrike (Diary from Africa), was written and printed by his friend from Požega, Julije Kempf, whom Lerman informed about the course of the exploration. The second one was published in 1894 with the title Novi dnevnik iz Afrike (New diary from Africa). Lerman provided inspiration for two additional explorers (Mirko and Stjepan Seljan) who were mapping Africa and South America at the turn of the 20th century.

A big part of the collection that Lerman brought home from the Congo, 493 artifacts, was donated to the Ethnographic Museum in Zagreb and has been part of the permanent exhibition ever since. His original diary is in the archives of the Croatian Academy of Sciences and Arts.

He died in Kreševo, Bosnia and Herzegovina, where his gravestone is still visible. His brother's grandson Željko Reiner served as the speaker of the Croatian Parliament from 2015 to 2016.

== Sources ==
- "LERMAN, Dragutin". Croatian Biographical Lexicon (in Croatian). Zagreb: Miroslav Krleža Institute of Lexicography. 2013.
- Luka Pejić; Valentina Kezić (2025). "Return to "the Heart of Darkness": Dragutin Lerman's Colonial Activities in Africa". Historijski zbornik. 78 (1). Croatian Historical Society: 117–144.
