= Andro Vlahušić =

Croatian politician (born 1960)

Mayor of Dubrovnik
- In office June 2009 – January 2017
- Preceded by: Dubravka Šuica
- Succeeded by: Nada Medović (Acting); Mato Franković

Minister of Health
- In office 22 November 2001 – 23 December 2003
- Prime Minister: Ivica Račan
- Preceded by: Ana Stavljenić-Rukavina
- Succeeded by: Andrija Hebrang

Member of the Croatian Parliament
- In office 2 February 2000 – 22 November 2001
- Succeeded by: Željko Dragović
- Constituency: X electoral district

Personal details
- Born: 17 May 1960 (age 66) Imotica, PR Croatia, FPR Yugoslavia
- Party: HSLS; HNS (2005–present)
- Children: Frano Vlahušić
- Education: University of Zagreb

Andro Vlahušić (born 17 May 1960) is a Croatian physician and politician. A member of the Croatian People's Party (HNS), Vlahušić was a member of the Croatian Parliament (2000–2001) and Minister of Health in the second cabinet of Prime Minister Ivica Račan (2001–2003). From 2009 to 2017 he served as Mayor of Dubrovnik.

Political offices
Preceded by Ana Stavljenić-Rukavina	Minister of Health; 2001–2003	Succeeded by Andrija Hebrang as Minister of Health and Social Welfare
Preceded by Dubravka Šuica	Mayor of Dubrovnik; 2009–2017	Succeeded by Nada Medović (acting); Mato Franković
