= Ana Stavljenić Rukavina =

Croatian scientist and politician

Minister of Health
- In office 27 January 2000 – 23 October 2001
- Prime Minister: Ivica Račan
- Preceded by: Željko Reiner
- Succeeded by: Andro Vlahušić

Personal details
- Born: 15 August 1939 (age 87) Duga Resa, Kingdom of Yugoslavia (modern Croatia)
- Education: University of Zagreb

Ana Stavljenić Rukavina (born 15 October 1939) is a Croatian biomedical scientist, academic and politician. She served as Minister of Health of Croatia between 2000 and 2001, and became a local politician of Zagreb

== Early life and education ==
Stavljenić Rukavina was born in Duga Resa. She obtained a degree in medical biochemistry from the University of Zagreb in 1963, and a degree in medicine in 1968, before going on to earn a PhD in medical sciences in 1976 from the same university and passed her specialisation examination in 1979.

She completed her postgraduate studies at the Royal Postgraduate Medical School in London, the NATO Advanced Study Institute, the Simon Stevin Institute in Bruges, the US National Institutes of Health in Bethesda and the University of California, Berkeley.

== Career ==
She has worked in laboratories in Croatia and across Europe, including at the Vuk Vrhovac University Clinic for 15 years, and as head of two departments at the Faculty of Medicine of theUniversity of Zagreb for 23 years, where she was a professor between 1990 and 2014, when she became professor emerita.

Stavljenić took office as Minister of Health of Croatia in Ivica Račan's new government on 27 January 2000, succeeding Željko Reiner, and announced her intention to abolish customs tariffs for medicines and medical products and to reform the health system. After two months in office, Stavljenić presented a package of measures to financially consolidate the country’s public health system, which was facing a debt of over 3.2 billion Croatian kuna – at least 400 million US dollars. In August 2000, she presented a proposal to reform the healthcare system. She worked also to ban the dual practice of medical professionals, in which those working in the public sector also worked in the private sector.

Following the deaths of 23 patients within 48 hours due to the use of faulty dialysis machines, Stavljenić tendered her resignation on 14 October 2001, which Prime Minister Račan declined and ordered an investigation. She resigned on 23 October 2001.

In 2005, she tried to become rector of the University of Zagreb, but was unsuccessful.

In the 2013 Zagreb local elections, Mayor Milan Bandić asked her to join the electoral list, and Stavljenić remained his right-hand woman. On 30 June 2021 she was arrested, among others, accused of abuse of power and authority for rigging the selection process for the director of Srebrnjak Hospital on Bandić’s orders.
