= Anne Hiltner =

- Born: March 18, 1941
- Died: September 6, 2010 (aged 69)
- Education: BA in Chemistry, Reed College, 1963 PhD in Physical Chemistry, Oregon State University, 1967
- Occupation: Polymer Scientist
- Spouse: Eric Baer

Anne Hiltner (18 March 1941- 6 September 2010) was an American polymer scientist who founded the Center for Applied Polymer Research (CAPRI) and was later instrumental in the founding of the Center for Layer Polymeric Systems (CLiPS), a National Science Foundation Science and Technology Center at Case Western Reserve University. She served as Director of the Center for Layered Polymeric Systems from its founding in 2006 until her death in 2010.

== Education ==
Hiltner received a Bachelor of Arts in Chemistry from Reed College in 1963 and went on to receive a Physical Doctorate in Physical Chemistry from Oregon State University in 1967.

== Personal life ==
In 1999, she married Eric Baer, who was the Chairman of the Department of Macromolecular Science at Case Western Reserve University at that time. She died on September 6, 2010, at age 69 after battling illness.

== Career ==
=== Case Western Reserve University ===
After receiving her PhD in 1967, Hiltner began working as a research associate at Case Western Reserve University. During her first year as a research associate, she worked with chemistry professor Irvin M. Krieger. After her first year as a research associate, she worked in Eric Baer's laboratory. In 1971, Hiltner became a senior research associate in the Department of Macromolecular Science.

Hiltner made history in 1974 when she became an assistant professor of macromolecular engineering and the first female engineering faculty at Case Western Reserve. Later, in 1979, Hiltner was appointed an associate professor in the Macromolecular Science Department, a position she held until 1983.

In 1981, Hiltner founded the Center for Applied Polymer Research (CAPRI), which was an organization that encouraged collaboration in research across disciplines, particularly in applied polymer science, and was funded by the National Science Foundation (NSF).

Hiltner became a full professor of the Macromolecular Science Department in 1983.

In 1984, Hiltner was one of the authors of a proposal by the University of Akron and Case Western Reserve University to create an Advanced Technology Application Center in Polymers. This proposal was accepted and the Ohio Controlling Board approved a $4.1 million grant for the two universities. The universities decided to name their program the Edison Polymer Innovation Corporation (EPIC) after Hiltner suggested including the word "innovation," eventually leading to the acronym EPIC. The universities stated that the primary goal of EPIC was to "develop new materials and research technology that shows promise in rejuvenating the state's economy." Case Western Reserve coordinated its share of the work through CAPRI (which Hiltner was director of at the time) and researched polymer blends, polymer alloys, membranes, coatings, and lightweight composites. In its first few years, EPIC worked with corporations such as B.F. Goodrich, Firestone, and Goodyear. EPIC also patented a bandage to promote faster healing and helped form the Polymer Container Corporation in Akron, Ohio and NanoFilm in Valley View, Ohio.

Currently, EPIC is one of the world's largest associations for polymer research and provides a wide range of services to companies, including business assistance, research and development, and design and process improvement.

In 1997, CAPRI and the Biodegradable Polymer Research Center (BPRC) worked together on research on biodegradable micro layered polymer composite systems. Anne Hiltner was the principal investigator for this project and Eric Baer was the co-principal investigator. Hiltner and Baer generated micro- and nano- layered composite structures to study and characterize for degradation, while BPRC studied the degradation of kinetics from soil tests. The results from the research at BRPC helped guide the development of the composite structures being produced by CAPRI.

In 1998, CAPRI collaborated with the Center for Research of Macromolecules at the former Joseph Fourier University (now a part of the Université Grenoble Alpes). This U.S.-France collaboration focused on developing new composite materials with novel interactive electrical and mechanical properties, with Eric Baer as the principal investigator and Anne Hiltner as the co-principal investigator. Baer and Hiltner contributed their expertise in microlayering multiplying technology and materials processing and the French investigators contributed their experience with nano-scale technology to this project.

Hiltner was named the Herbert Henry Dow Professor of Science and Engineering at Case Western Reserve University in 2004.

In 2006, Hiltner secured funding from the NSF to found the multimillion-dollar Center for Layered Polymeric Systems (CLiPS) at Case Western Reserve University, which she would be the director of until her death. According to the NSF award, CLiPS aims to "create a broadly integrated program of research and education through the vehicle of a unique microlayering and nanolayering processing technology developed at Case Western Reserve University." Current partners of CLiPS include the University of Texas at Austin, the University of Southern Mississippi, Northwestern University, Kent State University, and the Naval Research Laboratory, all of whom are under the leadership of the current director, Eric Baer. There are also several other affiliate universities and high schools involved with CLiPS.

In addition to her polymer science work at Case Western Reserve, Hiltner also was a member of the Women's Center Executive Committee in 2001. This committee helped build the foundation for the Flora Stone Mather Center for Women by creating a position description for the full-time director of the Center and making a business plan for the Center's activities and identifying sources of supporting revenue.

=== Memberships and professional activities ===
Hiltner was involved in several societies, including the American Chemical Society (ACS), the American Physical Society, the Society of Biomaterials, the Society of Plastic Engineers, and the American Institute for Medical and Biological Engineering. Hiltner was quite involved in the American Chemical Society, serving as an Alternate Councilor in 1978, being a member of the Executive Committee in the Division of Polymer Chemistry from 1979 until 1981, and being a PMSE Fellow in 2006. Hiltner was also highly involved in the American Physical Society, having been a fellow, part of the Publication Committee from 1977 until 1980 (she was Chairman in 1980), part of the Membership Committee from 1979 until 1981, and part of the Program Committee for the Division of High Polymer Physics in the early '80s. She was also on the Editorial Board for the Journal of Biomedical Materials Research.

== Selected publications ==
This is a list of publications for which Anne Hiltner is the primary author.

- Hiltner, P. Anne; Krieger, Irvin M. (1969-07-01). "Diffraction of light by ordered suspensions". The Journal of Physical Chemistry. 73 (7): 2386–2389. doi:10.1021/j100727a049. ISSN 0022-3654.
- Hiltner, Anne; Baer, Eric (1972). "Comparison of Dynamic Mechanical Relaxation Processes at Cryogenic Temperatures in Polyesters". Journal of Macromolecular Science. Part 3: Physics: 545-557. DOI:10.1080/00222347208219133.
- Hiltner, Anne; Baer, Eric (1972). "A Dislocation Mechanism for Cryogenic Relaxations in Crystalline Polymers". Polymer Journal. 3 (3): 378–388. doi:10.1295/polymj.3.378. ISSN 1349-0540.
- Hiltner, Anne; Anderson, James M.; Borkowski, Edward (1972-07-01). "Side-Group Motions in Poly(α-amino acids)". Macromolecules. 5 (4): 446–449. doi:10.1021/ma60028a020. ISSN 0024-9297.
- Hiltner, Anne; Anderson, James M.; Baer, Eric (1973). "Dynamic mechanical analysis of poly-α-amino acids. Models for collagen". Journal of Macromolecular Science, Part B. 431-443. DOI:10.1080/00222347308201630.
- Hiltner, Anne; Baer, Eric.(1974) "Mechanical properties of polymers at cryogenic temperatures: relationships between relaxation, yield and fracture processes". Polymer. 15 (12): 805–813. doi:10.1016/0032-3861(74)90142-6.
- Hiltner, Anne (1979). "Interaction of water with macromolecules by dynamic mechanical analysis". Polymer Engineering and Science. 19 (10): 722–727. doi:10.1002/pen.760191012. ISSN 1548-2634.
- Hiltner, Anne (1987). Order in the Amorphous “State” of Polymers. Springer, Boston, MA. pp. 119–133. doi:10.1007/978-1-4613-1867-5_6. ISBN 9781461290414.

== Awards and honors ==
- 1999, Roon Award from the Federation of Societies of Coatings Technology
- 2001, Cooperative Research Award in Polymer Science and Engineering from the American Chemical Society
- 2005, Spotlight Series Prize for Women's Scholarship from the Flora Stone Mather Center for Women
- 2005, Outstanding Achievement Award from the Society of Plastics' Engineers (SPE)
- 2006, PMSE Fellow, American Chemical Society
- 2008, American Chemical Society Award in Applied Polymer Science from the American Chemical Society
