= Eric Baer =

American scientist and engineer

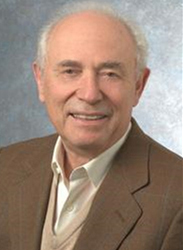
- Born: 18 July 1932 (age 94); Nieder-Weisel, Hesse, Germany
- Education: Baltimore City College; Johns Hopkins
- Known for: Elastomeric polyolefins, rubber toughening of brittle polymers
- Awards: Charles Goodyear Medal (2018)
- Scientific career
- Fields: Polymer science

Eric Baer, (born Erich Bär; July 18, 1932) is an American scientist and engineer known for his major research and educational contributions to polymer science and engineering. He is a leading pioneer in understanding the complex relationships between solid state structure, processing, and properties of polymeric materials and systems.

Baer was born in Nieder-Weisel, Hesse, Germany on July 18, 1932. He was raised as an only child in a Jewish home by his parents, Arthur and Erna Baer (née Kraemer). His father and his father's brother, Julius, owned a clothing and accessory store in Butzbach, Hessen, which was closed by the Nazis around 1937. Arthur was taken to the Buchenwald concentration camp during Kristallnacht, the evening of November 8, 1938, and was luckily released in June, 1939, since the family had received permission to emigrate immediately to England. They traveled by boat from The Hague, Netherlands and arrived in England on August 28, 1939. The family was taken to London and survived the blitz. Baer was evacuated north to Dunstable, Bedfordshire in December 1940.

In 1956 Baer married Ana Golender, who was both a chemist and homemaker. Ana and Eric had two children, Lisa and Michelle, both of whom pursued professional careers, in law and medicine respectively. Ana died in 1995 after a long illness and in 1999, Baer married Professor Ann Hiltner, a long time professional colleague. Hiltner, the first female chaired professor in the School of Engineering at Case Western Reserve University, died in 2010. In 2016, Baer married Jane Glaubinger. Jane served for many years as the Curator of Prints and Drawings at the Cleveland Museum of Art and is now retired.

Baer's formal education began in the early spring of 1941 after the family's move to England when he was approaching nine years of age. He entered elementary school and was placed in classes with six-year-old children. He quickly skipped grades and was accepted into the prestigious Church of England Dunstable Grammar School in the autumn if 1942. It was during his time at Dunstable Grammar School that his interest in science was stimulated. Baer and his parents moved to the United States in December, 1947. There they joined a large number of relatives who had the good fortune to leave Germany prior to the Holocaust and World War II.

Baer graduated from Baltimore City College (high school) in 1949. In 1951, Baer entered graduate school at Johns Hopkins University majoring in organic chemistry. His first research was on the synthesis of intermediate compounds to mimic naturally occurring strained ring structures. After earning his M.A. in 1953, he was attracted by an opportunity in rapid heat transfer kinetics by dropwise condensation, and transferred to the Johns Hopkins University School of Engineering majoring in chemical engineering. Baer earned a Doctor of Engineering degree in 1957 and immediately joined E. I. DuPont Polychemicals Division, at the Experimental Station in Wilmington, Delaware. He had no previous education or exposure to the field of polymer science and engineering. While at DuPont he learned for the first time the many aspects of polymer science and engineering concentrating mainly on structure property relationships and small scale processing. This education in an advanced industrial setting served as the foundation for the remainder of his scientific career.

In 1962 he joined the engineering faculty at Case Institute of Technology (which is now Case Western Reserve University.) His goal at CWRU was to develop a major program in advanced polymer education and research which, under his leadership, became the current Department of Macromolecular Science and Engineering. Today, Baer serves at CWRU as Distinguished University Professor and holds the Herbert Henry Dow Chair in Science and Engineering. Currently he is also the Director of CLiPS, the Center for Layered Polymeric Systems.

Over the last twenty years, Baer has led a large team in the creation of polymer layered systems. Focus on both micro and nanolayered structures has inspired the development of novel gradient index lenses and superior layered dielectric films for energy storage. Today, new layered systems are being developed under his direction for uses in food packaging, ballistic resistant layered structures, and security features.

== Awards ==
Among his other notable awards, in 2018, he received the Charles Goodyear Medal of the ACS Rubber Division; he also received the James L. White Innovation Award (2016), and the William A. Fowler Award (2015). In 2014, he was received the Paul J. Flory Research Prize at the PolyChar World Forum in Advanced Materials, and in 2000, was inducted into the Plastics Hall of Fame. In 1996, he received the Paul J. Flory Polymer Education Award, he also was awarded an honorary doctorate by the Russian Academy of Sciences (1993), and in 1991, he received the International Education Award from the Society of Plastics Engineers.

== Selected publications ==
- Baer, Eric (1975). Engineering design for plastics (in German). Huntington, N.Y.: R.E. Krieger Pub. Co. ISBN 0-88275-281-2. OCLC 1176687.
- Baer, Eric; Moet, Abdelsamie; Aglan, H. (1991). High performance polymers : structure, properties, composites, fibers. Munich: Hanser. ISBN 0-19-520853-6. OCLC 22240218.
- Chang, A.; Cheung, Y. W.; Hiltner, A.; Baer, E. (27 November 2001). "Relationship of deformation behavior to thermal transitions of ethylene/styrene and ethylene/octene copolymers". Journal of Polymer Science Part B: Polymer Physics. 40 (1). Wiley: 142–152. doi:10.1002/polb.10066. ISSN 0887-6266.
- Gaucher-Miri, V.; Jones, G. K.; Kaas, R.; Hiltner, A.; Baer, E. (2002). "Plastic deformation of EVA, EVOH and their multilayers". Journal of Materials Science. 37 (13). Springer Science and Business Media LLC: 2635–2644. doi:10.1023/a:1015872129472. ISSN 0022-2461. S2CID 135020163.
- Wang, Haopeng; Keum, Jong K.; Hiltner, Anne; Baer, Eric; Freeman, Benny; Rozanski, Artur; Galeski, Andrzej (6 February 2009). "Confined Crystallization of Polyethylene Oxide in Nanolayer Assemblies". Science. 323 (5915). American Association for the Advancement of Science (AAAS): 757–760. Bibcode:2009Sci...323..757W. doi:10.1126/science.1164601. ISSN 0036-8075. PMID 19197057. S2CID 19276.
- Baer, E.; Hiltner, A.; Keith, H. D. (27 February 1987). "Hierarchical Structure in Polymeric Materials". Science. 235 (4792). American Association for the Advancement of Science (AAAS): 1015–1022. Bibcode:1987Sci...235.1015B. doi:10.1126/science.3823866. ISSN 0036-8075. PMID 3823866.
