= Lola Eniola-Adefeso =

Nigerian-American chemical engineer

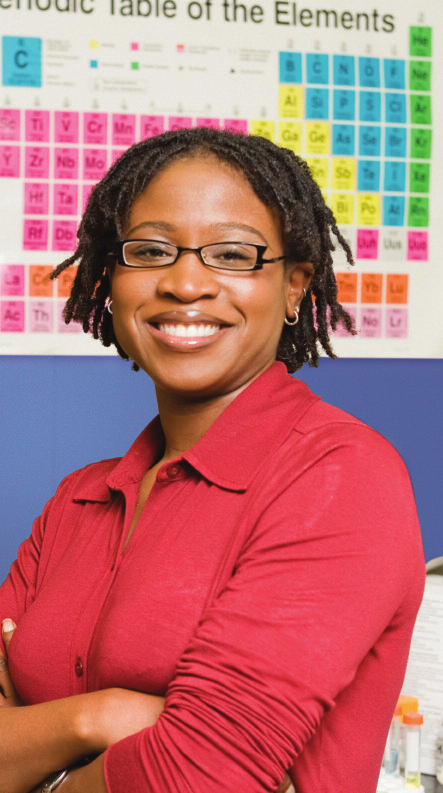
- Eniola-Adefeso in NIGMS Findings Magazine, 2009
- Born: Maryland, USA
- Education: University of Maryland, Baltimore County; University of Pennsylvania
- Scientific career
- Workplaces: University of Illinois Chicago University of Michigan Baylor College of Medicine
- Website: https://che.engin.umich.edu/people/lola-eniola-adefeso/

Omolola (Lola) Eniola-Adefeso is a Nigerian-American chemical engineer and incoming Dean of the College of Engineering at the University of Illinois Chicago.

She is currently the Vennema Endowed Professor of Chemical Engineering, the Associate Dean for Graduate and Professional Education, and University Diversity and Social Transformation Professor of Chemical Engineering, Biomedical Engineering, and Macromolecular Science and Engineering at the University of Michigan College of Engineering.

Eniola-Adefeso is also a co-founder and chief scientific officer of Asalyxa Bio. Her research looks to design biocompatible functional particles for targeted drug delivery.

== Education ==
Eniola-Adefeso moved to Maryland from Nigeria at the age of 16. She was going to attend medical school but became interested in chemical engineering. Eniola-Adefeso studied Chemical and Biomolecular Engineering at University of Maryland, Baltimore County, graduating in 1999. She moved to University of Pennsylvania for her postgraduate studies, graduating in 2004.

== Career ==
=== Scientific impact ===
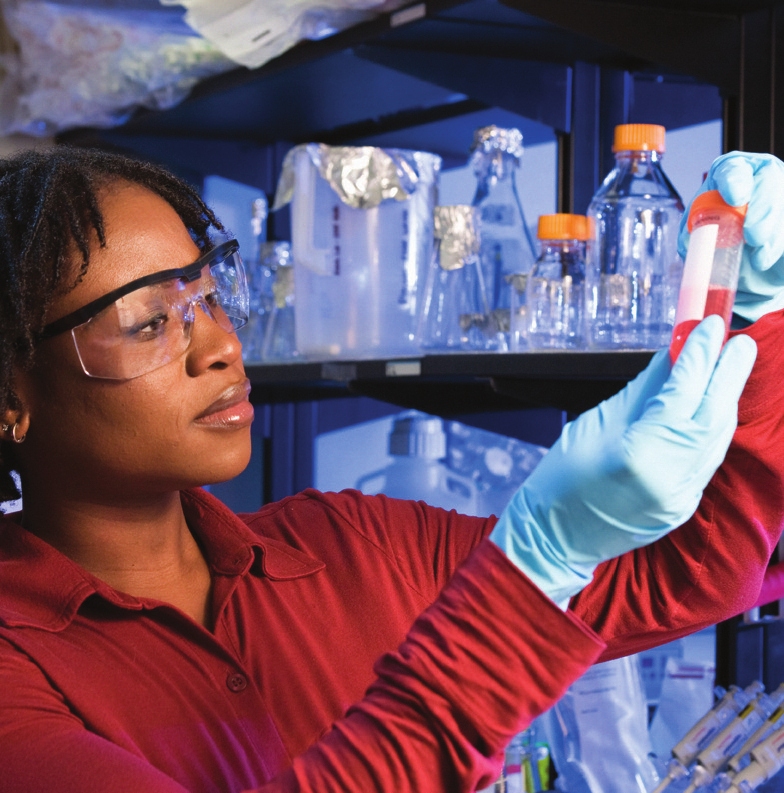
Eniola-Adefeso in NIGMS Findings Magazine, 2009.

After completing her graduate studies, Eniola-Adefeso worked in the Baylor College of Medicine as a National Institutes of Health postdoctoral fellow. Eniola-Adefeso joined University of Michigan in 2006. In 2013, she was named a Miller Faculty Scholar at the University of Michigan and now also serves as the associate dean for graduate and professional education in the college of engineering. She is interested in the interactions between blood leukocytes and endothelial cells in vessel lumen lining, and how they change during inflammation response. After losing her father to heart disease, Eniola-Adefeso began to research new treatments for it.

Eniola-Adefeso's research has focused on leveraging hemodynamics to design vascular-targeted particle therapies. Challenging the status quo, she has published a multitude of "firsts" in the field. Publications from her lab were the first to demonstrate that nanoparticles' size, shape, and density – acting as "vascular-targeting drug carriers (VTCs)"- matter in their ability to reach and bind the blood vessel wall. This bold body of work has been instrumental in "redefining the problem" of advancing the development of controlled delivery solutions to vascular diseases and is catalyzing novel solutions. Her lab's systematic use of ex vivo models of human microvessels and blood flows, followed closely with in vivo assays in mice, sensitized the biomedical engineering field to recognizing "blood as a tissue" with distinct features across species.

Her lab has since leveraged its models to reveal new information about neutrophils (PMNs) and their interactions with VTCs. They provided the first evidence of circulating PMNs rapidly binding and phagocytosing particles within minutes. This landmark observation paved the way for her lab's interest in particle-based immunomodulation of PMNs in acute and chronic inflammatory conditions.

Eniola-Adefeso always aims to leverage fundamental science discovery in her lab toward clinical applications. In this vein, she demonstrated in a Science Advances publication from 2020 that human neutrophils prefer to phagocytose (i.e., eat) rod-shaped particles, which is counter to the widely accepted notion in the literature – primarily based on work with mouse blood and cell lines – that blood phagocytes do not effectively eat rods. This revelation offers a novel approach to targeting neutrophils in numerous diseases.

Her critical discovery, coupled with an innovative polymer, has led to the recent formation of a startup company, Asalyxa Bio, where Eniola-Adefeso holds the chief scientific officer position. Since its incorporation in July, she has led the company to raise funds for a first-in-human clinical trial toward developing this technology to treat Acute Respiratory Distress Syndrome (ARDS).

Eniola-Adefeso is a Fellow of the American Institute for Medical and Biological Engineers (AIMBE) and Biomedical Engineering Society (BMES). She serves as a deputy editor for Science Advances, on the board of directors for AICHE and AIMBE, and as a member of the external advisory board for the biomedical engineering department at the University of Florida and Boston University.

=== Diversity, equity, and inclusion work ===
Eniola-Adefeso is a champion for women and underrepresented minority students within University of Michigan. She has established a mentoring scheme and served as graduate chair, recruiting the most diverse cohort of students in the department's history. She encouraged undergraduate students to develop experiments for K-12 teachers to use in their classrooms. Eniola-Adefeso has been involved in the College of Engineering NextProf program, which brings women and minority students to campus to experience academic life. In 2018, along with Professor Chinedum Okwudire, she co-established the NextProf Pathfinder Workshop, a future-faculty program specifically aimed at first- and second-year PhD students, rather than final year PhD students and postdoctoral fellows, as is typical in many other institutions. The goal of the NextProf Pathfinder Workshop is to equip the attendees – mostly women and students from underrepresented groups – with the knowledge and skills needed to develop strong CVs, early in their PhD process, to make them competitive for faculty positions. The NextProf Pathfinder program has now expanded to include the University of California, San Diego and the Georgia Institute of Technology.

In 2021, Eniola-Adefeso and BME colleagues from many US institutions called out racial funding disparity by the National Institutes of Health garnering support for these larger institutional DEI changes from both academic and non-academic communities. The paper and the national advocacy effort led by Eniola-Adefeso led the NIH Director to publicly apologize for 'structural racism,' in NIH funding and pledges actions".

== Honors and fellowships ==
- 2021 MLK Visiting Professorship, MIT
- 2020 Biomedical Engineering Society Fellow
- 2020 BMES Mid-Career Award
- 2020 Named in the Top 1000 Inspiring Black scientists in America by CellPress
- 2019 Martin Luther King Jr. Faculty Spirit Award
- 2019 University Diversity and Social Transformation Professor
- 2017 Senior Fellow, Michigan Society of Fellows
- 2017 American Institute of Chemical Engineers, Women's Initiatives Committee's Mentorship Excellence Award
- 2017 American Institute for Medical and Biological Engineering Fellow
- 2017 MAC Grimes Excellence in Chemical Engineering Award, AIChE
- 2017 Raymond J. and Monica E. Schultz Outreach and Diversity Award
- 2016 Harold R. Johnson Diversity Service Award
- 2016 CEW Carol Hollenshead Award for Excellence in Promoting Equity and Social Change
- 2014 Faculty Fellow, University of Michigan College of Engineering
- 2013 Miller Faculty Scholar
- 2012 National Science Foundation Career
- 2012 Provost's Teaching Innovation Prize, University of Michigan
- 2011 National Science Foundation CAREER Award
- 2011 Lloyd N. Ferguson Young Scientist Award, NOBCChE
- 2010 American Heart Association Innovator Award
- 2004 Janice Lumpkin Awards For Excellence in Arts & Sciences
- 2003 NASA Graduate Research Fellowship
- 1999 University of Maryland, Baltimore County Meyerhoff Scholarship
- 1998 University of Maryland, Baltimore County MARC U* STAR Scholar

== Select publications ==
- Roy van der Meel; Marcel H A M Fens; Vader, Pieter; Wouter W van Solinge; Omolola Eniola-Adefeso; Raymond M Schiffelers (2014). "Extracellular vesicles as drug delivery systems: lessons from the liposome field". Journal of Controlled Release. 195: 72–85. doi:10.1016/j.jconrel.2014.07.049. PMID 25094032. Wikidata Q38237168.
- Phapanin Charoenphol; Ryan B Huang; Omolola Eniola-Adefeso (2009). "Potential role of size and hemodynamics in the efficacy of vascular-targeted spherical drug carriers". Biomaterials. 31 (6): 1392–1402. doi:10.1016/j.biomaterials.2009.11.007. PMID 19954839. Wikidata Q47582525.
- Phapanin Charoenphol; Supriya Mocherla; Diane Bouis; Katawut Namdee; David J Pinsky; Omolola Eniola-Adefeso (2011). "Targeting therapeutics to the vascular wall in atherosclerosis--carrier size matters". Atherosclerosis. 217 (2): 364–370. doi:10.1016/j.atherosclerosis.2011.04.016. PMID 21601207. Wikidata Q38334991.
