= Bouenza River =

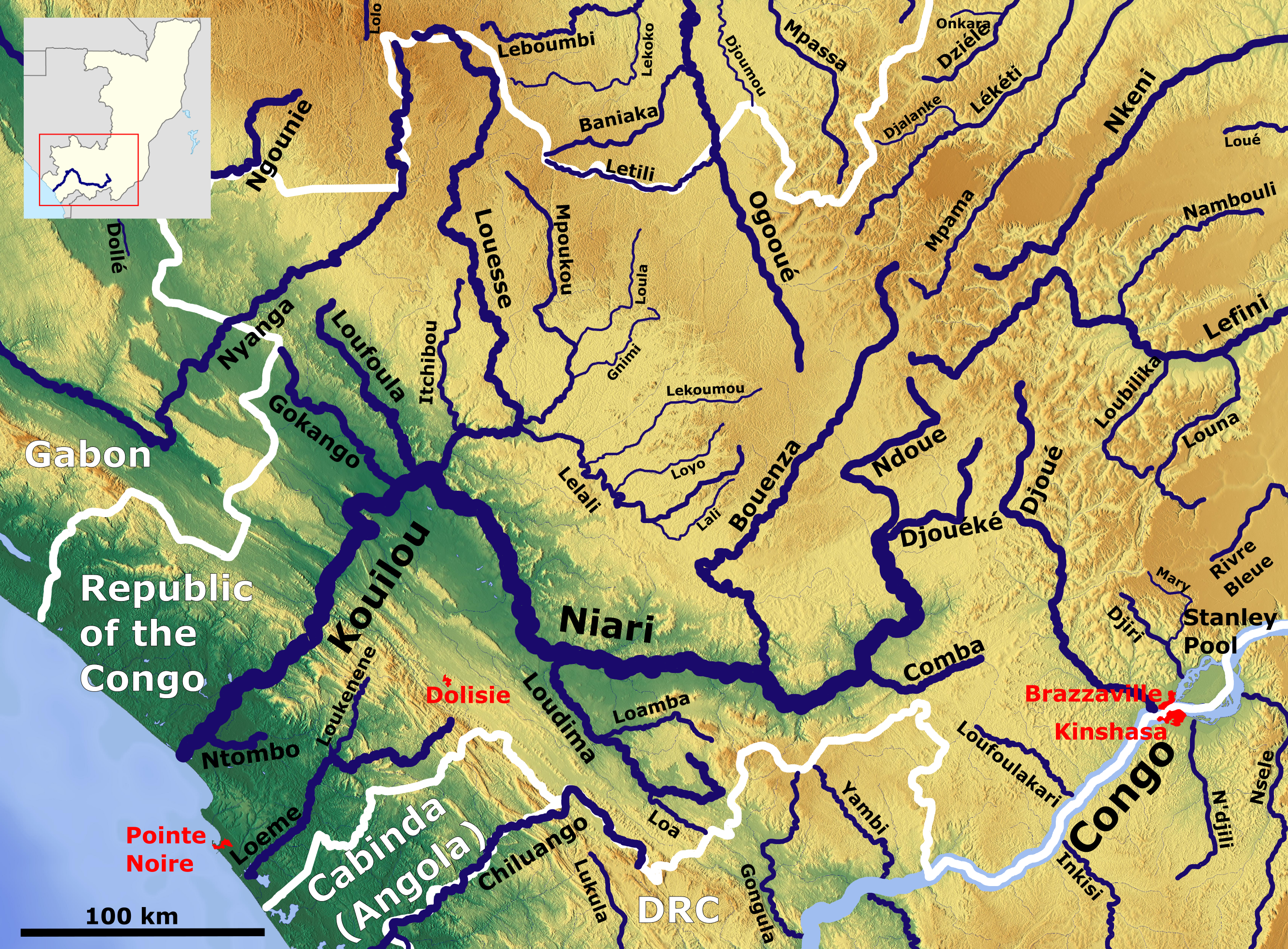
- Kouilou-Niari River basin

- Location within Republic of the Congo

Location
- Country: Republic of the Congo

Physical characteristics
- Mouth: Niari River
  - coordinates: 4.186550°S 13.821485°E

Basin features
- River system: Kouilou-Niari River

The Bouenza River is a river of the Republic of the Congo. It is a right tributary of the Niari River. It feeds the Moukoukoulou Hydroelectric Power Plant.

== Course ==
The Bouenza River meanders for most of its course. The northern part of the river flows in a southwest direction, forming the border between the Lékoumou and Pool departments. Lower down it flows southeast and then south through the Bouenza Department to its confluence with the Niara at the town of Kimpombo.

== History ==
In 1883 the Belgian Captain Edmond Hanssens established the post of Philippeville at the limit of the territories granted to Pierre Savorgnan de Brazza. The post was founded at the confluence of the Bouenza and Niari rivers on behalf of Belgian interests under the cover of the Haut Congo Study Committee. The operation was in response to a concern by king Leopold II of Belgium that the Portuguese might prevail in their claim to control the mouth of the Congo River. If so, Belgium would need an outlet to the Atlantic north of Loango.

== Hydroelectricity ==
The 74-MW Moukoukoulou hydroelectric power plant on the Bouenza River is the most important in the country. It was built by Chinese technicians in 1974. During the 1999 civil war the plant was damaged, and since then only provided 25 MW. In May 2007 President Denis Sassou Nguesso visited Moukoukoulou, where all four turbine generators had been rehabilitated at a cost of US$12 million, although work on transformers was still not complete. Damage to the transmission network was preventing its power from reaching Brazzaville, which was relying on power from the Inga plants in the Democratic Republic of Congo.

== Sources ==
- "Congo Republic restores 74-MW Moukoukoulou", Hydro Review, 7 May 2007
- Engels, A. (23 December 1946), "HANSSENS (Edmond-Winnie-Victor)", Biographie Coloniale Belge, vol. I, Inst. roy. colon. belge, pp. col. 479–493
- Moundza, Patrice (2017-03-15), Géographie du Congo: Mélanges offerts au Professeur Bonaventure Maurice Mengho, Editions L'Harmattan, ISBN 978-2-14-003259-2
- "Way: Bouenza (78550472)", OpenStreetMap
