= Julije Kempf =

Croatian historian and writer (1864–1934)

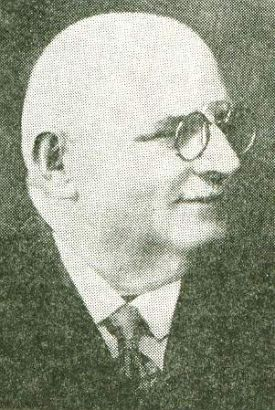
Julije Kempf

Julije Kempf (25 January 1864 – 6 June 1934) was a Croatian historian and writer. Kempf was born in Požega, Slavonia. After graduating from Požega gymnasium, he attended teachers school in Zagreb. Afterwards, he worked in Novi Vinodolski as a teacher, before returning to Požega in 1885 to teach in Elementary school for boys.

Kempf supported the founding of, and eventually presided over Požega valley teachers' association, finally becoming a member of Union of Croatian teachers' associations. He became headmaster of the Elementary school for boys in Požega in 1902, was later appointed Royal county school superintendent and also founded the city's Cultural and Historical Museum, becoming its President in 1925. That same year, Kempf became mayor of Požega, and he served his city in that way for four years.

Kempf travelled throughout Croatia, many other parts of then Austria-Hungary, Germany, Italy, Bosnia-Herzegovina, Montenegro and Romania. His literary works, "From Sava to Adria through Bosnia and Herzegovina" (1898), "Along the coast of Adria" (1902), "From Požega valley" (1914), "Around Psunj mountain" (1924), "Topusko spa" (1929), and many others, bear witness that Kempf had systematically noted his travels. Kempf wrote prefaces for two books of letters he had received from Dragutin Lerman while Lerman was in Africa. These books were "Letters from Africa from Dragutin Lerman" (1891) and "New letters from Africa from Dragutin Lerman" (1894), and represent conscious effort to give readers, especially citizens of Požega, an insight into faraway continent.

His most important work is "Požega, geographic notes from the area and articles of history of free and royal city of Požega and Požega county", published in 1910.

In 1910 Kempf was first to be named honorary citizen of Požega. After his retirement from professional career, he became even more socially active. He was active participant of various societies and associations such as "Croatian reading room", "Požega valley teachers' association", "Volunteer Firefighter Association of Požega", Croatian Singing Association "Vijenac", "Mountaineer Association" and many others.
