= Annals of Medicine =

- Discipline: Medicine
- Language: English
- Edited by: Timo Partonen

Publication details
- History: 1969–present
- Publisher: Taylor and Francis Group
- Frequency: 8/year
- Impact factor: 3.886 (2014)

Standard abbreviations
- ISO 4: Ann. Med.

Indexing
- CODEN: ANMDEU
- ISSN: 0785-3890 (print); 1365-2060 (web)
- LCCN: sn89036299
- OCLC no.: 19550892

Links
- Journal homepage; Online access; Online archive

Annals of Medicine is a peer-reviewed medical journal that publishes research articles as well as reviews on a wide range of medical specialties, with a particular focus on internal medicine. The journal covers advances in the understanding of the pathogenesis of diseases and in how medicine and molecular genetics can be applied in daily clinical practice. The journal is published 8 times per year by Taylor and Francis Group and the editor-in-chief is Timo Partonen.

== Indexing and abstracting ==
Annals of Medicine is abstracted and indexed in Index Medicus, EMBASE, Biological Abstracts, Chemical Abstracts, Current Awareness in Biological Sciences, Current Contents/Clinical Medicine, Current Contents/Life Sciences, Psychological Abstracts, Research Alert, and the Science Citation Index.
