= Kelly Stevens =

American bioengineer

- Education: University of Washington; University of Wisconsin-Madison
- Scientific career
- Workplaces: University of Washington
- Thesis: Controlling cell proliferation and tissue formation for myocardial repair (2008)
- Website: Stevens Lab

Kelly Stevens is an American bioengineer and associate professor at the University of Washington. Her research considers the study and development of human platforms to understand and treat disease. She was named a Paul G. Allen Frontiers Fellow in 2022.

== Early life and education ==
Stevens received training fellowships from the National Science Foundation and the University of Washington Bioengineering Cardiovascular Training Grant. She earned her doctorate at the University of Washington in 2008, during which she investigated tissue formation for myocardial repair.

== Research and career ==
Stevens looks to understand biological processes including cellular assembly. She uses the tools of stem cell and synthetic biology and 3D bio-printing. Bio-printing looks to create healthy, functioning organs from patient's own cells. Her research looks to create human platforms to understand and treat infectious disease.

She has extensively studied the liver, one of the body's few regenerative tissues, to identify new strategies to repair livers damaged by cancer or liver disease. She has studied the factors that influence liver development, including genetic instructions, mechanical forces, blood supply and the liver environment. By creating synthetic technologies that emulate the liver and its local environment, Stevens looks to encourage primordial cells to evolve into different liver cells.

== Academic service ==
Alongside her research, Stevens is committed to improving justice, equity and inclusion in academia. She published a roadmap to assist faculty in effectively hiring staff from historically excluded groups. The roadmap was created using evidence-based practises, including preparation, proactive recruitment and inclusive interviewing. She has led initiatives to fund Black scientists, cite Black authors and challenge stereotypes.

== Awards and honours ==
- 2010 Ruth L. Kirschstein Individual National Research Service Award
- 2016 Wellcome Trust Image Award
- 2022 Allen Distinguished Investigator

== Select publications ==
- Jordan S Miller; Kelly R Stevens; Michael T Yang; et al. (1 July 2012). "Rapid casting of patterned vascular networks for perfusable engineered three-dimensional tissues". Nature Materials. 11 (9): 768–774. doi:10.1038/nmat3357. ISSN 1476-1122. PMC 3586565. PMID 22751181. Wikidata Q30537022.
- Bagrat Grigoryan; Samantha J Paulsen; Daniel C Corbett; et al. (1 May 2019). "Multivascular networks and functional intravascular topologies within biocompatible hydrogels". Science. 364 (6439): 458–464. Bibcode:2019Sci...364..458G. doi:10.1126/science.aav9750. ISSN 0036-8075. PMID 31048486. Wikidata Q91711085.
- K R Stevens; K L Kreutziger; S K Dupras; et al. (17 September 2009). "Physiological function and transplantation of scaffold-free and vascularized human cardiac muscle tissue". Proceedings of the National Academy of Sciences of the United States of America. 106 (39): 16568–16573. Bibcode:2009PNAS..10616568S. doi:10.1073/pnas.0908381106. ISSN 0027-8424. PMC 2746126. PMID 19805339. Wikidata Q24652369.
