= Nature Reviews Cardiology =

- Discipline: Cardiology
- Language: English
- Edited by: Gregory Lim

Publication details
- Former name: Nature Clinical Practice Cardiovascular Medicine
- History: 2004–present
- Publisher: Nature Portfolio
- Frequency: Monthly
- Impact factor: 49.421 (2021)

Standard abbreviations
- ISO 4: Nat. Rev. Cardiol.

Indexing
- CODEN: NRCAE6
- ISSN: 1759-5002 (print); 1759-5010 (web)
- OCLC no.: 390768635

Links
- Journal homepage; Online archive

Nature Reviews Cardiology is a monthly peer-reviewed scientific journal published by Nature Portfolio. It was established in 2004 as Nature Clinical Practice Cardiovascular Medicine, but change name in April 2009. The editor-in-chief is Gregory Lim.

Coverage includes:

- acute coronary syndromes
- arrhythmias
- angina/coronary artery disease
- cardiomyopathy/heart failure
- concomitant disease
- congenital conditions
- hypertension
- imaging
- infection
- interventional cardiology
- pathology
- stroke
- surgery/transplantation
- thrombosis
- valvular disease
- vascular disease
- general therapies
- disease markers
- genetics and public health.

According to the Journal Citation Reports, the journal has a 2021 impact factor of 49.421, ranking it 1st out of 143 journals in the category "Cardiac & Cardiovascular Systems".
