= Journal of Biomedical Materials Research =

- Discipline: Biomedical engineering
- Language: English

Publication details
- Former names: Biomedical Materials Symposium; Journal of Applied Biomaterials
- History: 1967–2002
- Publisher: John Wiley & Sons
- Frequency: 22/year

Standard abbreviations
- ISO 4: J. Biomed. Mater. Res.

Indexing
- Journal of Biomedical Materials Research
- CODEN: JBMRBG
- ISSN: 0021-9304 (print); 1097-4636 (web)
- LCCN: 73009767
- OCLC no.: 01784387
- Biomedical Materials Symposium
- CODEN: BMMSB8
- ISSN: 0099-9288
- Journal of Applied Biomaterials
- CODEN: JABIEW
- ISSN: 1045-4861
- LCCN: 90640937
- OCLC no.: 20119099

The Journal of Biomedical Materials Research is a peer-reviewed scientific journals of biomedical material science. It was established in 1967. In 1974, it absorbed Biomedical Materials Symposium (1971–1974). In 1990, it absorbed the journal Journal of Applied Biomaterials (1990–1995). In 2002, it split into two parts, Journal of Biomedical Materials Research Part A, and Journal of Biomedical Materials Research Part B. The two parts are published by John Wiley & Sons.

== Part A ==
Journal of Biomedical Materials Research Part A
- Discipline: Biomedical engineering
- Language: English
- Edited by: J. Kent Leach

Publication details
- History: 2003–present
- Publisher: John Wiley & Sons
- Frequency: Monthly
- Impact factor: 4.396 (2020)

Standard abbreviations
- ISO 4: J. Biomed. Mater. Res. A

Indexing
- CODEN: JBMRCH
- ISSN: 1549-3296 (print); 1552-4965 (web)
- LCCN: 2003242186
- OCLC no.: 51822573

Links
- Journal homepage

Journal of Biomedical Materials Research Part A was established in 2003. It is edited by James M. Anderson.

=== Abstracting and indexing ===
Part A is indexed and abstracted in the following bibliographic databases:

- Advanced Technologies & Aerospace Database
- Agricultural & Environmental Science Database
- Biological Abstracts
- Biological Science Database
- BIOSIS Previews
- CAS: Chemical Abstracts Service
- Chemical Abstracts Service/SciFinder
- ChemWeb
- Chimica Database
- COMPENDEX
- Current Contents: Life Sciences
- Embase
- EMCare
- Health & Medical Collection
- Health Research Premium Collection
- Hospital Premium Collection
- Journal Citation Reports/Science Edition
- Materials Science & Engineering Database
- MEDLINE/PubMed
- Natural Science Collection
- PASCAL Database
- ProQuest Central
- PubMed Dietary Supplement Subset
- Science Citation Index
- Science Citation Index Expanded
- SciTech Premium Collection
- SCOPUS
- Technology Collection
- Web of Science

According to the Journal Citation Reports, the journal has a 2020 impact factor of 4.396, ranking it 25th out of 90 in the category 'Engineering, Biomedical' and 18th out of 41 in the category 'Materials Science, Biomaterials.

== Part B ==
Journal of Biomedical Materials Research Part B
- Discipline: Biomedical engineering
- Language: English
- Edited by: Jeremy L. Gilbert

Publication details
- History: 2003–present
- Publisher: John Wiley & Sons
- Frequency: 8/year
- Impact factor: 3.368 (2020)

Standard abbreviations
- ISO 4: J. Biomed. Mater. Res. B

Indexing
- CODEN: JBMRGL
- ISSN: 1552-4973 (print); 1552-4981 (web)
- LCCN: 2003242187
- OCLC no.: 776194477

Links
- Journal homepage; Online access; Online archive

The Journal of Biomedical Materials Research Part B: Applied Biomaterials covers design, development, production, and application of biomaterials and medical devices. Publishing formats are original research papers, short reports, reviews, current concepts, special reports, and editorials. It is an official journal of the Society for Biomaterials, the Japanese Society for Biomaterials, the Australasian Society for Biomaterials, and the Korean Society for Biomaterials. The editor-in-chief is Jeremy L. Gilbert (Syracuse University).

=== Abstracting and indexing ===
Part B is indexed and abstracted in the following bibliographic databases:

- Biological Abstracts
- BIOSIS Previews
- Chemical Abstracts Service
- Compendex
- CSA/ProQuest databases
- Current Contents/Life Sciences
- International Bibliographic Information on Dietary Supplements
- Materials Science Citation Index
- MEDLINE
- METADEX
- Science Citation Index
- Scopus
- VINITI

According to the Journal Citation Reports, the journal has a 2020 impact factor of 3.368, ranking it 43rd out of 90 in the category 'Engineering, Biomedical' and 27th out of 41 in the category 'Materials Science, Biomaterials.
