= Cell Transplantation =

- Discipline: Regenerative medicine
- Language: English
- Edited by: Paul R. Sanberg; Shinn-zong Lin

Publication details
- History: 1992–present
- Publisher: SAGE Publications
- Frequency: Monthly
- Impact factor: 2.885 (2017)

Standard abbreviations
- ISO 4: Cell Transplant.

Indexing
- CODEN: CTRAE8
- ISSN: 0963-6897 (print); 1555-3892 (web)
- LCCN: 93660087
- OCLC no.: 936515063

Links
- Journal homepage; Online access; Online archive

Cell Transplantation is a monthly peer-reviewed medical journal covering regenerative medicine. It was established in 1992 and was originally published by Cognizant Communication Corporation until 2017, when it was acquired by SAGE Publications. The editors-in-chief are Paul R. Sanberg (University of South Florida College of Medicine) and Shinn-zong Lin (Tzu Chi University). According to the Journal Citation Reports, the journal has a 2017 impact factor of 2.885, ranking it 62nd out of 133 journals in the category "Medicine, Research & Experimental".
