= Kouilou-Niari River =

River in the Republic of the Congo

Coordinates: 4°28′21″S 11°42′17″E

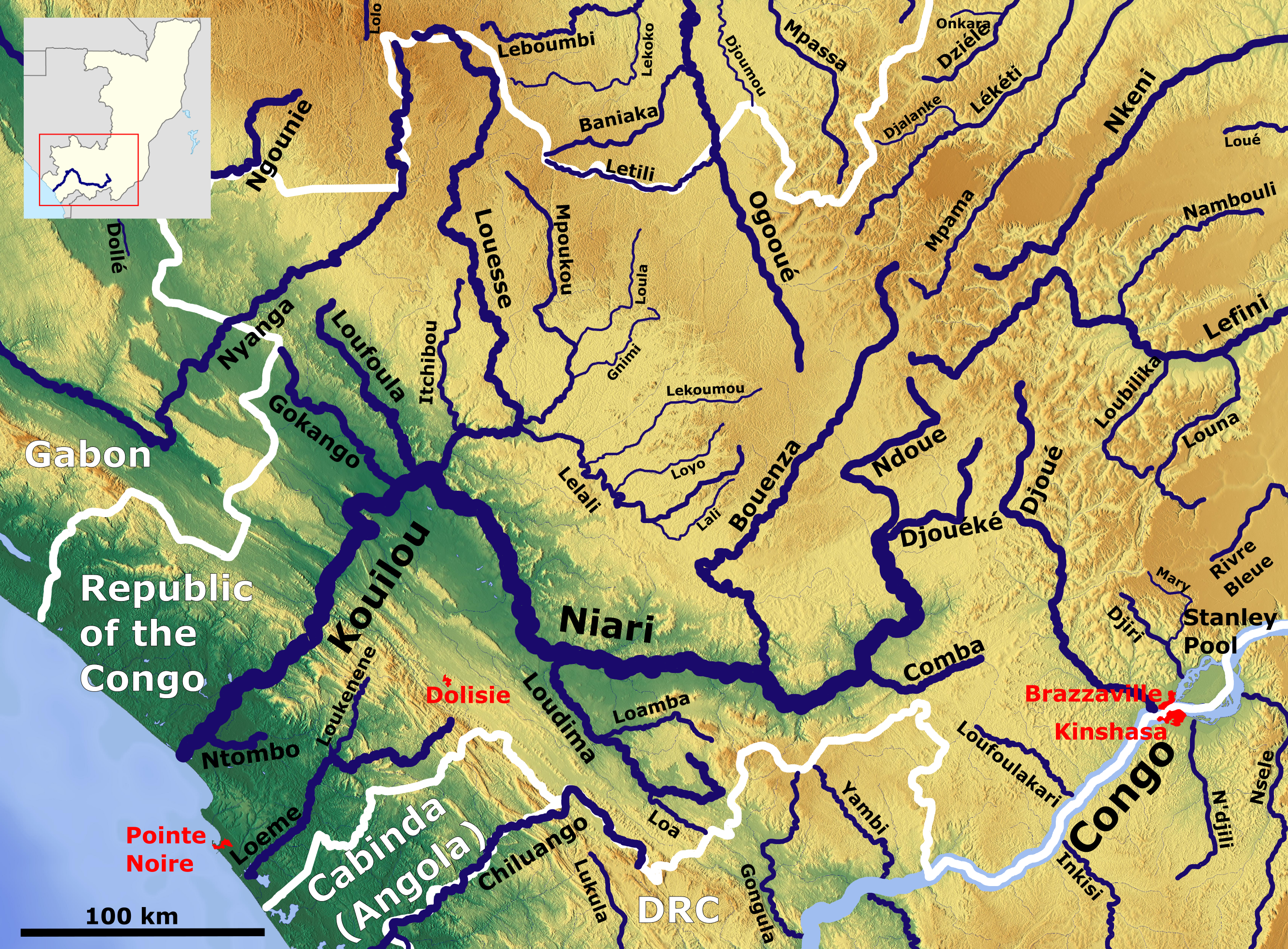
Kouilou-Niari River basin

The Kouilou-Niari River—also spelled Kwilu, Kwila, or Kwil—is the most important river flowing to the Atlantic Ocean of the Republic of the Congo coast. Moreover, its entire drainage area is completely in the Republic of the Congo.

== Geography and environment ==
The river is called the Kouilou River while flowing in the coastal region of the Kouilou from the Sounda gorges. Upstream from the gorges, its name is the Niari River and it flows through the Niari Valley. The river combines with the Louessé, the Loudima and the Bouenza River and eventually flows into the Atlantic Ocean. It covers about 560 km from its origin in the Batéké Plateau of the Congo to its mouth at the coast. The lower Kouilou basin has been designated an Important Bird Area (IBA) by BirdLife International because it supports significant populations of many bird species.

== Hydrology ==
The river has numerous waterfalls and is impassable from its mouth, which is of difficult access by multiple sandbars, formed primarily by the action of the Benguela current. The river is usable and boats are coming up to Kakamoéka. From Kakamoéka to Sounda, rapids and rocks are blocking access especially during dry season. Very limited traffic upstream Sounda as they are rapids and a few bridges. Bridges on the river are located at Bas-Kouilou, Sounda, Kimbangou, Makabana, Loudima and Bouenza.

The Kouilou part is fairly flat with the water level rising only 16 metres above sea level on first 70 km. In the area of Kimbangou, the water level is around 60 metres above sea level and reaches 115 metres at the Loudima junction.

=== Waterfalls ===
- Zrinski chutes: Honors Nikola Zrinski and Petar Zrinski, Croatian nobles of the Zrinski family; "discovered" and named in 1882 by Dragutin Lerman, a Croatian member of Henry Morton Stanley's expedition. Local names, and local knowledge in general, are unfortunately ignored in such naming.
- Sounda gorges. The gorges are remarkable with a small waterdrop of two metres and mountain around 120 metres high. An old iron bridge is still usable in 2012 to cross the river in Sounda. A road comes from the village of Mandzi south of Sounda while the road continues on north west toward Kakamoéka, sous-prefecture. An abandoned track on the southern bank of the river reaches Kakamoéka which was created during the exploration for the train. The mission Jacob was conducted in 1896. The track was reopened in 1954 for the evaluation of the hydro potential of the Sounda dam.

== Hydroelectric developments ==
In Sounda, a large hydro electrical project has been evaluated since the mid-1950s when France was looking at developing the region. Ten years of research have led to a tunnel built in the mountain, a bridge and a camp established on site.

In May 2011, a protocole d'accord has been signed with a South African Company IDG and the Republic of Congo for the development of the Sounda dam project. IDG has teamed up with strategic partner African Power Corporation (APC). The two companies have joined forces to lead the development of the project. Coming together with the potential users and financial institution to put the project on track for success. Such a project is expected to help develop the country's huge mineral potential. In October 2012, APC increased their presence in the country and name a country representative. Nicolas Rouzé has a great experience in the Congo as he has been in country since 1998. He is managing the efforts in the country to drive the project on the local scale.

== Annex ==
- Nicolas Tourot, Les Projets de développement hydroélectrique en Afrique noire, mémoire de maîtrise, Paris I, 2003

EDF, études préliminaires du site hydroélectrique de Sounda, 1954.
