= Atherosclerosis (journal) =

- Discipline: Atherosclerosis
- Language: English

Publication details
- History: 1970–present
- Publisher: Elsevier on behalf of the European Atherosclerosis Society
- Frequency: Monthly
- Impact factor: 6.847 (2021)

Standard abbreviations
- ISO 4: Atherosclerosis

Indexing
- CODEN: ATHSBL
- ISSN: 0021-9150
- OCLC no.: 1518525

Links
- Journal homepage; Online archive

Atherosclerosis is a monthly peer-reviewed scientific journal established in 1970 and published by Elsevier. It is the official journal of the European Atherosclerosis Society and is affiliated with the International Atherosclerosis Society.

Atherosclerosis brings together, from all sources, papers concerned with investigation on atherosclerosis, its risk factors and clinical manifestations. Atherosclerosis covers basic and translational, clinical and population research approaches to arterial and vascular biologyand disease, as well as their risk factors including: disturbances of lipid and lipoprotein metabolism, diabetes and hypertension, thrombosis, and inflammation. The journal can publish original or review papers dealing with the pathogenesis, environmental, genetic and epigenetic basis, diagnosis or treatment of atherosclerosis and related diseases as well as their risk factors.

The editor-in-chief is Arnold von Eckardstein. According to the Journal Citation Reports, the journal has a 2021 impact factor of 6.847.

== Scope ==
The journal covers all aspects of atherosclerosis and related diseases.

== Abstracting and indexing ==
This journal is abstracted and indexed in:

- Chemical Abstracts Service – CASSI
- BIOSIS Previews
- Chemical Abstracts
- Current Contents/Clinical Medicine
- Current Contents/Life Sciences
- EMBASE/Excerpta Medica
- Elsevier BIOBASE
- MEDLINE
- PASCAL
- FRANCIS
- Science Citation Index
- Scopus
