= Siniša Varga =

Croatian dentist and politician

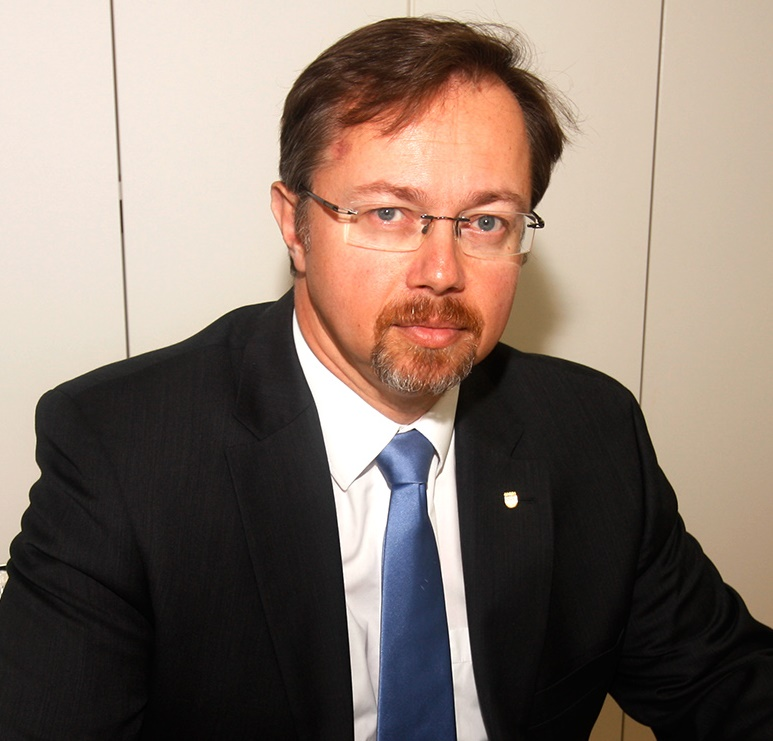

Minister of Health
- In office 11 June 2014 – 22 January 2016
- Prime Minister: Zoran Milanović
- Preceded by: Rajko Ostojić
- Succeeded by: Dario Nakić

Personal details
- Born: 24 September 1965 (age 61) Zagreb, SR Croatia, SFR Yugoslavia (modern Croatia)
- Party: Social Democratic Party
- Children: 2
- Education: University of Zagreb (School of Dental Medicine)
- Occupation: Dentist

Siniša Varga (born 24 August 1965) is a Croatian dentist and politician who served as Minister of Health in the centre-left Cabinet of Zoran Milanović from 2014 until 2016.

== Early life ==
Varga was born on August 24, 1965, in Zagreb. He graduated in 1990 at the Faculty of Dentistry, University of Zagreb.

== Dentist ==
From 1993 to 1997 he specialized in prosthodontics at the Dental Clinic of the Clinical Hospital Centre Zagreb. As part of his specialized practice in 1995 he worked in Gothenburg (Sweden) at Branemark Implantology Clinic. In 1997, as a specialist in dental prosthetics, he was head of the surgical prosthetics, Clinical Department of Oral Surgery, for surgery of the face and jaw, at University Hospital Dubrava. The center is the only one of its kind in Croatia.

His special interest in general and health management earned him a degree of international quality systems manager for the International Standard ISO 9001: 2000 from the European Organization for Quality.

From 2000 to 2002, he worked as a consultant for the World Bank project on health care reform in the Republic of Croatia. During this period he was an assistant director of the Clinical Hospital Dubrava. In 2004, Varga became responsible for the organization of the teaching module "Resource Management in Health Care", study "Leadership and Management of Health and Science" at the School of Public Health "Andrija Štampar" at University of Zagreb.

In 2008 he became a consultant on a World Bank project to reform health care in Bosnia and Herzegovina.

He is a member of the Croatian Dental Society, Croatian Medical Association, where he served as the Secretary-General for two four-year terms. He is a member of the Croatian Society of Volunteers of Croatian Homeland war for independence, the Croatian Society of Quality Managers and the Croatian Standards Institute in two technical committees: dentistry and quality management. Varga is a court expert for prosthodontics and a mentor for education of new experts.

== Political career ==
From 2002 to 2004 he was an official of the Croatian Government in the Ministry of Health and Social Welfare, as the deputy minister of health for professional medical affairs. The government appointed Varga to a working group for preparation of negotiations for European Union accession in 2007. In 2010 Siniša Varga became a member of the Croatian Social Democratic Party. After directing the Croatian Institute for Health Insurance from April 2012 to June 2014, the government appointed him as Minister of Health.

== Private life ==
Varga is married and has two children. He was a volunteer in Croatian War of Independence and holds a memorial of Homeland war. He speaks English and some French. He is an active member of the Rotary Club of Zagreb through which he supports humanitarian actions.
