= Neven Ljubičić =

Croatian physician and politician

Minister of Health and Social Welfare
- In office 16 February 2005 – 12 January 2008
- Prime Minister: Ivo Sanader
- Preceded by: Andrija Hebrang
- Succeeded by: Darko Milinović

Personal details
- Born: 1 May 1963 (age 63) Nin, SR Croatia, SFR Yugoslavia (modern Croatia)
- Party: Croatian Democratic Union
- Education: University of Zagreb (School of Medicine)

Neven Ljubičić (born 1 May 1963) is a Croatian physician and politician, best known for serving as Croatia's Minister of Health and Social Welfare from 2005 to 2008 in the first cabinet of Ivo Sanader.

== Overview ==
Ljubičić graduated from Zagreb University School of Medicine in 1987, where he also received his doctorate in 1993 before passing his specialty exam in internal medicine in 1996. He practiced medicine at the Holy Ghost Hospital and the Sisters of Charity Hospital in Zagreb.

A member of the Croatian Democratic Union (HDZ), in 2004 he was appointed assistant to health minister Andrija Hebrang, and after Hebrang's resignation he was made minister in February 2005 under Prime Minister Ivo Sanader. He served in that post until the end of the Sanader cabinet in January 2008.
