= Labar =

Labar or LaBar is a surname. Notable people with this surname include:

- Boris Labar (born 1947), Croatian haematologist
- Daniel E. LaBar (1857–1939), American politician
- Jeff LaBar (1963–2021), American guitarist
- Ronan Labar (born 1989), French badminton player
