= Hrstić =

Hrstić is a South Slavic surname.

In Croatia, it's most commonly found among the Croats, less often among the Serbs and Bosniaks. It is traced to eastern Herzegovina.

Notable people with the surname include:

- Irena Hrstić (born 1969), Croatian politician
- Miloš Hrstić (born 1955), Croatian football coach and former player
- Matej Hrstić (born 1996), Croatian handball player
- Peter Hrstic (born 1961), Austrian retired international footballer
- Srđan Hrstić (born 2003), Serbian footballer
