= Milan Kujundžić =

Croatian physician and politician

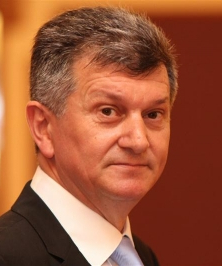

Member of the Croatian Parliament
- In office 29 January 2020 – 5 July 2020
- Prime Minister: Andrej Plenković
- Constituency: X electoral district

Minister of Health
- In office 19 October 2016 – 28 January 2020
- Prime Minister: Andrej Plenković
- Preceded by: Dario Nakić
- Succeeded by: Vili Beroš

Personal details
- Born: 27 April 1957 (age 69) Ivanbegovina near Imotski, PR Croatia, FPR Yugoslavia
- Party: Croatian Democratic Union (1992–2013; 2016–present)
- Other political affiliations: Croatian Dawn (2013–2016); Croatian Democratic Party (1990–1992)
- Spouse: Tatjana Kujundžić (m. 1982)
- Children: 2
- Education: University of Zagreb
- Occupation: Politician
- Profession: Physician (gastroenterologist)
- Website: Official website

Milan Kujundžić (pronounced [mǐlan kujǔndʒitɕ]; born 27 April 1957) is a Croatian physician and politician who held the position of Minister of Health in the Cabinet of Andrej Plenković between 2016 and 2020.

== Career ==
Kujundžić was born in the village of Ivanbegovina near Imotski, Croatia. He graduated from the University of Zagreb School of Medicine in 1982 and obtained his Ph.D. in medicine in 1992.

Since 2005, Kujundžić serves as a head-master of Clinical Hospital Dubrava.

== Political career ==
From 2004 to 2005, Kujundžić served as assistant of the Minister of Health and Social Welfare.

A longtime member of Croatian Democratic Union (HDZ), he resigned from the party following his defeat in party chairmanship election in May 2012, which was won by Tomislav Karamarko. Kujundžić then founded a right-wing political party Croatian Dawn, established in July 2013 but returned to HDZ in 2016.

In 2012, Kujundžić was a candidate for the president of the Croatian Democratic Union, and in the 20 May 2012 election he came in second after Tomislav Karamarko. In the presidential election in 2014, he was a candidate for the president, but was defeated with conquered 6.3 percent of the vote.

== See also ==
- Cabinet of Andrej Plenković
