= Alliance for Croatia =

- Founded: 5 February 2014
- Dissolved: 2015
- Headquarters: Zagreb, Croatia
- Political position: Right-wing

Alliance for Croatia (Croatian: Savez za Hrvatsku) was a right-wing electoral alliance in Croatia. The aim of the coalition was the joint appearance of smaller right-wing parties in the 2014 European Parliament elections and 2014–2015 Croatian presidential elections. The coalition was dissolved in 2015.

The coalition consisted of:

- Croatian Democratic Alliance of Slavonia and Baranja
- Croatian Party of Rights
- Croatian Dawn – Party of the People
- Authentic Croatian Peasant Party
- Family Party
- Action for a Better Croatia
- A Vow for Croatia
- Croatian Growth dissidents

In the European Parliament elections in 2014 the coalition received 6.88% of the vote. Although they passed the threshold of 5%, they did not win a seat. In the presidential elections later that year, their candidate Milan Kujundžić finished fourth with 6.30% of the vote.
