= Darko Milinović =

Croatian politician and gynecologist

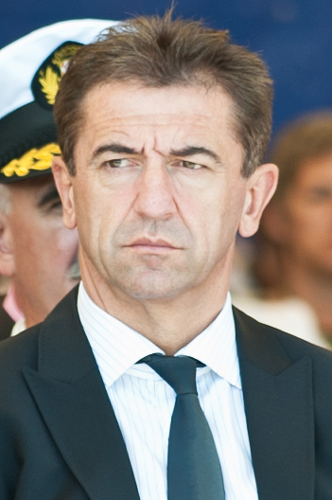

Mayor of Gospić
- Incumbent
- Assumed office 23 June 2024
- Deputy: Ivica Kovačević
- Preceded by: Karlo Starčević

Prefect of the Lika-Senj County
- In office 25 May 2017 – 3 June 2021
- Preceded by: Milan Kolić
- Succeeded by: Ernest Petry

Member of the Croatian Parliament
- In office 22 December 2011 – 22 July 2020

Deputy Prime Minister of Croatia
- In office 19 November 2009 – 23 December 2011
- Prime Minister: Jadranka Kosor
- Preceded by: Position established
- Succeeded by: Neven Mimica

Minister of Health and Social Welfare
- In office 12 January 2008 – 23 December 2011
- Prime Minister: Ivo Sanader (2008–2009); Jadranka Kosor (2009–2011)
- Preceded by: Neven Ljubičić
- Succeeded by: Rajko Ostojić

Personal details
- Born: 25 April 1963 (age 63) Gospić, SR Croatia, SFR Yugoslavia
- Party: LiPO (2020–present); Independent (2018–2020); Croatian Democratic Union (1989–2018)
- Spouse: Blaženka
- Children: Antonija, Mirna, Marko
- Education: School of Medicine, University of Zagreb

Darko Milinović (born 25 April 1963) is a Croatian politician and gynecologist who has served as mayor of Gospić since June 2024. He was re-elected in the first round of the 2025 local election.

Milinović served as prefect of Lika-Senj County from May 2017 to June 2021. He previously served as Minister of Health and Social Welfare from 2008 to 2011, Deputy Prime Minister from 2009 to 2011, and a member of the Croatian Parliament until 2020. In December 2020, he founded the regional political party LiPO and became its president.

== Biography ==
Milinović was born in Gospić. After graduating from the University of Zagreb School of Medicine in 1987, Milinović went on to specialise gynaecology, passing his specialty exam in 1996. He spent most of his professional career practicing in his home town of Gospić, and from 1998 to 2002 he held the post of the Gospić General Hospital director.

After joining the centre-right Croatian Democratic Union (HDZ) in the 1990s he obtained his first political post when he was appointed a member of the Gospić city council in 1998. In 2000 he was made member of the HDZ central committee and from 2000 to 2002 was head of HDZ in the city of Gospić. From 2002 to 2003 he held the office of deputy head of the Lika-Senj County. Following HDZ's victory in the 2003 parliamentary elections Milinović was elected to the Croatian Parliament. From 2003 to 2008 he held posts of Deputy Speaker of the Parliament and was a member of the parliamentary committee for family affairs, youth and sports.

After HDZ won the 2007 elections Milinović was appointed Minister of Health and Social Welfare in the new cabinet headed by Prime Minister Ivo Sanader on 12 January 2008, replacing Neven Ljubičić who had held the post from 2005 to 2008. Following Sanader's abrupt resignation on 1 July 2009, the cabinet was reconstructed and Milinovć retained his post in the new cabinet headed by Sanader's successor, Jadranka Kosor, which was officially announced on 6 July 2009.

== Education and specialisation ==
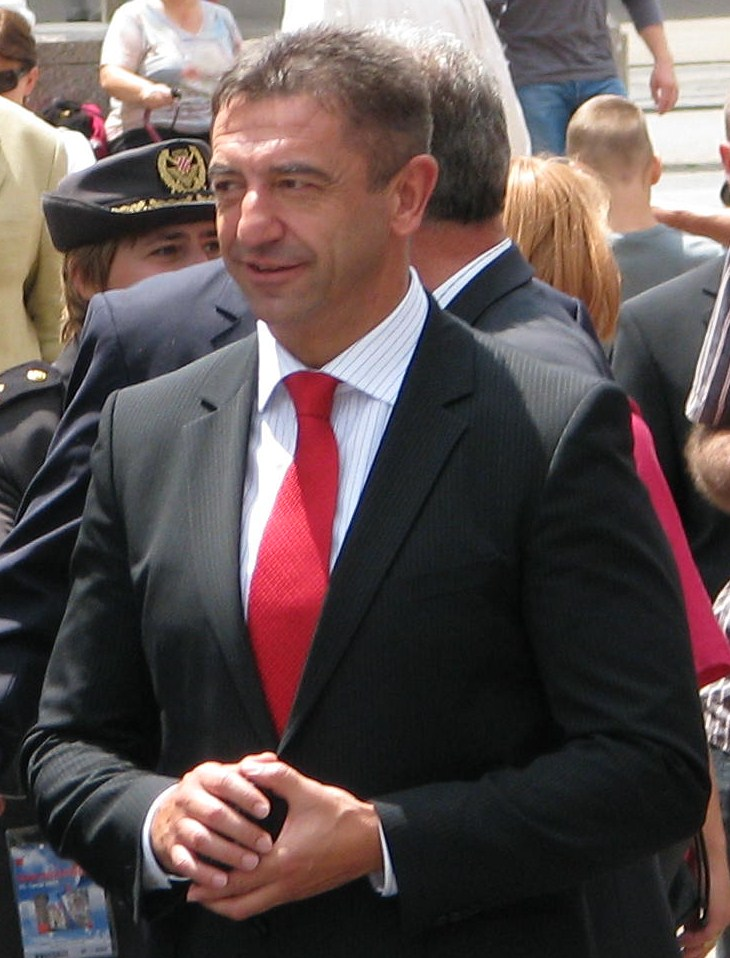
Darko Milinović, 2009

- 2007. Degree of High business school Libertas: Superorporate management for supervisory boards and governing counciles
- 200.5Mastr's degree in gynecology „Minimalno agresivna terapija cervikalnih intraeph neoplu cilju očuvanja fertilne sposobnosti žena“
- 1996. Specialist gynecology and obstetrics exam
- 1993. Course: „Health care system“, Ministry of Health
- 1987. Degree, Faculty of medicine

== Professional career ==
- 2002. – 2008. Re-elected for the director of General hospital, Gospić
- 2000. Head of the gynaecological diseases and birth department, Gospić
- 1998. .Director of .hospital, Gospić

== Political career ==
- 2011. Croatian Parliament member, president of the Family, youth and sport committee, member of the Health and social care committee
- 2009. – 2011. Vice-president of the Croatian Government, Minister of health and social care
- 2009. – 2012. Deputy of the HDZ President
- 2008. – 2009. Minister of health and social care
- 2008. Re-elected for the president of Lika senj HDZ county committee and member of HDZ presidency
- 2003. – 2008. Croatian Parliament member, Deputy president of Croatian parliament, member of the Family, youth and sport committee
- 2003. Member of HDZ presidency, Clinical centre Rijeka governing council president, Plitvice lakes National park governing council president
- 2002. – 2003. County perfect deputy and county government member
- 2002. Lika-senj HDZ county committee president
- 2000. – 2002. HDZ City council president, Gospić
- 2000. HDZ presidency member
- 1998. County government member, Gospić
- 1989. HDZ member

== Memberships ==
- 2001. Croatian league for fight against cancer, deputy president
- 2001. Croatian league for fight against cancer, secretary of Lika senj county region
- 1996. Patriotic war defenders association Gospić, president

== Publications ==
- Majerović M, Milinović D, Orešković S, Matošević P, Mirić M, Kekez T, Kinda E, Augustin G, Silovski H: Hyperthermic Intraperitoneal Chemotherapy (HIPEC) and Cytoreductive Surgery (CS) as Treatment of Peritoneal Carcinomatosis: Preliminary Results in Croatia“; Collegium Antropologicum 2011
- Segregur J, Buković D, Milinović D, Orešković S, Pavelić J, Zupić T, Persec J, Pavić M.: „Fetal Macrosomia in Pregnant Women With Gestational Diabetes“, Collegium Antropologicum 2009
- Milinović D, Kalafatić D, Babić D, Orešković LB, Grsic HL, Orešković S.: „Minimally Invasive Therapy Of Cervical Intraepithelial Neoplasia For Fertility Preservation“; Pathol Oncol Res. 2009
- Pesek K, Buković D, Pesek T, Oresković S, Milinović D, Rukavina M, Pavić M, Zlojtro M.: „Risk Factor Analysis And Diagnoses Of Coronary Heart Disease In Patients With Hypercholesterolemia From Croatian Zagorje County“; Collegium Antropologicum 2008
- Liječenje difuzne tireoze radioaktivnim jodom
- Milinović D, Kalafatic D, Babić D, Beketić-Orešković L, Orešković S.: „Minimally Invasive Therapy Of Cervical Intraepithelial Neoplasia For Fertility Preservation“, CEOC (Central European Oncology Congress), Croatia, Opatija, June 2007.
- Magistarski rad, Medicinski fakultet Sveučilišta u Zagrebu „Minimalno agresivna terapija cervikalnih intraepitelnih neoplazija u cilju očuvanja fertilne sposobnosti žena“, Zagreb, 2005.

== Awards and medals ==
- Medal „Oluja“ for participation in military action Oluja
- Patriotic war testimorial
- Croatian olympic committee – Lika-senj county sport union – award for the encouragement of sport development
- City Gospić – city development contribution plaquette

== Hobby ==
- Indoor soccer, skiing, music
