= Andrija Hebrang (politician, born 1946) =

Croatian physician and politician

Minister of Health and Social Welfare
- In office 23 December 2003 – 25 February 2005
- Prime Minister: Ivo Sanader
- Preceded by: Andro Vlahušić
- Succeeded by: Neven Ljubičić

Deputy Prime Minister of Croatia
- In office 23 December 2003 – 15 February 2005
- Prime Minister: Ivo Sanader
- Preceded by: Željka Antunović; Slavko Linić; Goran Granić
- Succeeded by: Damir Polančec

Minister of Defence
- In office 14 May 1998 – 12 October 1998
- Prime Minister: Zlatko Mateša
- Preceded by: Gojko Šušak
- Succeeded by: Pavao Miljavac

Minister of Health
- In office 12 October 1993 – 14 May 1998
- Prime Minister: Nikica Valentić; Zlatko Mateša
- Preceded by: Juraj Njavro
- Succeeded by: Željko Reiner
- In office 30 May 1990 – 12 August 1992
- Prime Minister: Stjepan Mesić; Josip Manolić; Franjo Gregurić
- Preceded by: Office established
- Succeeded by: Juraj Njavro

Personal details
- Born: 27 January 1946 (age 80) Belgrade, PR Serbia, FPR Yugoslavia (modern Serbia)
- Party: Independent; Croatian Democratic Union (1990–2024)
- Height: 6 ft 5 in (196 cm)
- Spouse: Danijela Vrhovski
- Children: 3
- Parents: Andrija Hebrang; Olga Strauss
- Education: University of Zagreb (School of Medicine)
- Occupation: Physician

Andrija Hebrang (Croatian pronunciation: [ˈandrija ˈxebraŋg]; born 27 January 1946) is a Croatian physician and politician. He is a former member of the Parliament of Croatia. A physician by vocation, Hebrang had served three terms as Croatia's Minister of Health (1990–1992, 1993–1998, and 2003–2005) and spent three months as Minister of Defence (May–October 1998) under six different Prime Ministers. In addition, he was his party's candidate in the 2009–10 Croatian presidential election, eventually finishing third behind Ivo Josipović, and Milan Bandić, winning 12 percent of the vote in the first round.

== Early life ==
Andrija Hebrang was born in Belgrade, Yugoslavia (now Serbia), to Andrija Hebrang, a prominent Croatian-Yugoslav politician and Olga Strauss, who came from a well-to-do Pakrac Jewish family. Her parents saw to her education, and she learned to play the piano and to speak French and German. Hebrang's father joined the Communist Party and fought for the Partisans in World War II, becoming a close friend and adviser to Marshal Josip Broz Tito, and eventually rose to become a high-ranking government member. However, in the late 1940s, he fell out of favor with senior Party members, was arrested by the Yugoslav government for treason, and subsequently disappeared. The date of his death and the circumstances are unknown, though it is presumed he died ca. 1949 in a Belgrade prison; the circumstances remain unclear, and his body was never recovered. Ustashas killed 16 members of the Hebrang family during the Holocaust, and another ten members of his family were killed by the communist regime of the newly founded FPR Yugoslavia.

Young Andrija, along with his mother and siblings, were put under house arrest in 1948. His mother, Olga, was imprisoned for twelve years, and the children were sent to live with their aunt Ilona in Zagreb. They lived very poorly, as Ilona's husband was sent to the prison camp at Goli Otok for several years, and she was made to raise the three young children alone. Andrija saw his mother again when he was eleven and she was released from prison in 1960. The family was forced to change their surname to "Markovac" so that Olga could find employment.

After completing his gymnasium education, Hebrang enrolled at the School of Medicine, University of Zagreb, where he received his doctorate specializing in radiology and oncology, and began teaching at the university as a professor in 1985. He is married to Danijela Vrhovski-Hebrang, a doctor of medical biochemistry at the University of Zagreb, and they have three children.

== Political career ==
In 1990, he became a member of the newly formed Croatian Democratic Union. He became the Minister of Health from 1990 to 1992 and again from 1993 to 1998. During the Croatian War of Independence, he served as a coordinator of the armed forces from 1993 to 1994. He was first elected to the Croatian parliament in 1993 and again in 1995.

After the death of the Minister of Defense, Gojko Šušak, in 1998, he temporarily took over the position for four months. Afterwards, he withdrew from political life. He returned in 2001 as a member of the Croatian True Revival party, led by Miroslav Tuđman. However, after talks with the new head of the HDZ, Ivo Sanader, he returned to the Croatian Democratic Union. After the HDZ's victory in the Croatian parliamentary elections of 2003, he joined Sanader's government as one of the two vice-presidents and Minister of Health and Social Welfare from 2003 to 2005. For health reasons, he relinquished his position in government and resumed his role as a member of parliament.

== Presidential run ==
In July 2009, he was chosen by the HDZ to be their candidate for the 2009–2010 presidential election. He competed in the first round with eleven other candidates and won third place with 12.04% of the vote.

== Personal life ==
Hebrang is Jewish. He is married to Danijela Vrhovski, and they have three children together.

== Awards ==
- Grand Order of King Dmitar Zvonimir (1995)

Political offices
Preceded by Office created	Minister of Health; 1990–1992	Succeeded by Juraj Njavro
Preceded by Juraj Njavro	Minister of Health; 1993–1998	Succeeded by Željko Reiner
Preceded by Gojko Šušak	Minister of Defence; 1998	Succeeded by Pavao Miljavac
Preceded by Andro Vlahušić	Minister of Health and Social Welfare; 2003–2005	Succeeded by Neven Ljubičić
