= Juraj Njavro =

Croatian medical doctor and politician

Minister of Family, Veterans' Affairs and Intergenerational solidarity
- In office 19 December 1997 – 27 January 2000
- Prime Minister: Zlatko Mateša
- Preceded by: Office established
- Succeeded by: Ivica Pančić

Minister of Health
- In office 12 August 1992 – 13 October 1993
- Prime Minister: Hrvoje Šarinić; Nikica Valentić
- Preceded by: Andrija Hebrang
- Succeeded by: Andrija Hebrang

Personal details
- Born: 2 July 1938 Neum, Kingdom of Yugoslavia
- Died: 15 September 2008 (aged 70) Zagreb, Croatia
- Party: Croatian Democratic Union
- Education: University of Zagreb (School of Medicine)

Juraj Njavro (2 July 1938 – 15 September 2008) was a Croatian medical doctor and politician.

Njavro was born in Cerovica, near Neum in the Kingdom of Yugoslavia (today part of Bosnia and Herzegovina). He attended elementary school here and gymnasium in Dubrovnik, Croatia.

He served as a surgeon Vukovar's hospital during the city's intense siege within the Croatian War of Independence. He continued to work in the hospital right up until the fall of the city to Serb forces. Njavro was subsequently imprisoned and taken to the Sremska Mitrovica camp in Serbia. In late 1991 Njavro was released as part of a prisoner exchange.

He took part in Croatia's first post-independence parliamentary elections in 1992 and was elected as a member of the Croatian Democratic Union. From 12 August 1992, to 12 October 1993, he served as Croatia's Minister of Health. He served as a minister without portfolio from 12 October 1993, to 7 November 1995, won reelection in 1995, and served again without portfolio from 13 November 1996, to 19 December 1997. From 19 December 1997, to 27 January 2000, he served as Minister of Defenders from the Homeland War. He was reelected again in 2000 and retired in 2003.

Njavro wrote a book about his internment during the war entitled Glava dolje, ruke na leđa. After his retirement he served as the president of the Association of Croatian volunteer doctors 1990–1991.

He died on 15 September 2008, in Zagreb and was buried in the city's Mirogoj Cemetery.

Political offices
Preceded by Andrija Hebrang	Minister of Health; 1992–1993	Succeeded by Andrija Hebrang
Preceded by Office created	Minister of Veterans' Affairs; 1997–2000	Succeeded by Ivica Pančić
