= List of hospitals in Croatia =

In 2012, there were 79 hospitals and clinics in Croatia.

All hospitals listed below are operated by the Croatian health ministry. The ministry classifies hospitals into five categories:

- Clinical hospital centre (Klinički bolnički centar or KBC) – five major medical centres in the country, two of which are located in the capital city of Zagreb
- Clinical hospital (Klinička bolnica or KB) – three large hospitals, all based in Zagreb
- Clinic (Klinika) – three large clinics, two of which are located in Zagreb
- General hospital (Opća bolnica or OB) – 22 smaller general hospitals, serving individual counties around the country
- Specialist hospitals (Specijalne bolnice) – 27 specialised hospitals, including various children's hospitals, rehabilitation hospitals, psychiatric hospitals, and the like, scattered around the country

== List of hospitals ==
Clinical hospital centres

- KBC Osijek in Osijek
- KBC Rijeka in Rijeka
- KBC Sisters of Charity in Zagreb
- KBC Split in Split
- KBC Zagreb in Zagreb

Clinical hospitals

- KB Merkur in Zagreb - Medical center with 300 beds, Hospital employs some 1200 medical and support staff.
- KB Sveti Duh in Zagreb - Large General Hospital with over 600 beds. Hospital is located in Črnomerec district of Zagreb.
- KB Dubrava in Zagreb

General hospitals

- OB Bjelovar in Bjelovar
- ŽB Čakovec in Čakovec
- OB Dubrovnik in Dubrovnik
- OB Gospić in Gospić
- OB Karlovac in Karlovac
- OB Croatian Pride in Knin
- OB Dr. Tomislav Bardek in Koprivnica
- OŽB Našice in Našice
- OB Nova Gradiška in Nova Gradiška
- OB Ogulin in Ogulin
- OŽB Pakrac in Pakrac
- OŽB Požega in Požega
- OB Pula in Pula
- OB Dr. Ivo Pedišić in Sisak
- OB Dr. Josip Benčević in Slavonski Brod
- OB Šibenik-Knin County in Šibenik
- OB Varaždin in Varaždin
- OB Vinkovci in Vinkovci
- OB Virovitica in Virovitica
- OB Vukovar in Vukovar
- OB Zabok in Zabok
- OB Zadar in Zadar

== See also ==
- Healthcare in Croatia
