= Rajko Ostojić =

Croatian politician and physician

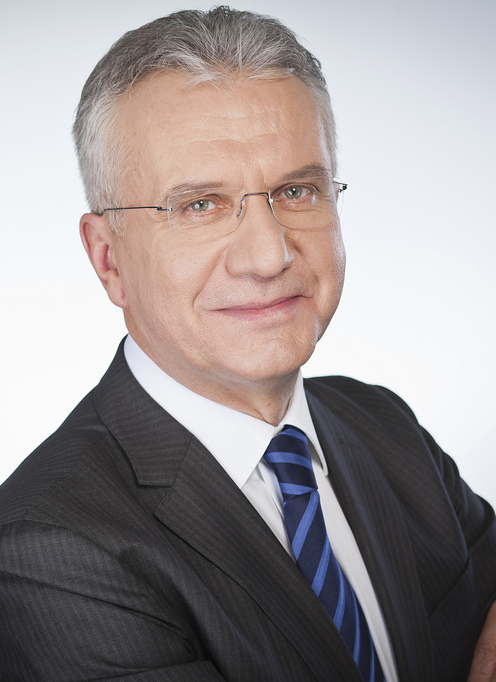

Deputy Speaker of the Croatian Parliament
- In office 22 July 2020 – 16 May 2024
- Preceded by: Siniša Hajdaš Dončić
- Succeeded by: Sabina Glasovac

Minister of Health
- In office 23 December 2011 – 11 June 2014
- Prime Minister: Zoran Milanović
- Preceded by: Darko Milinović
- Succeeded by: Siniša Varga

Personal details
- Born: 19 February 1962 (age 64) Zagreb, PR Croatia, FPR Yugoslavia
- Party: Social Democratic Party
- Education: University of Zagreb (School of Medicine)
- Occupation: Physician

Rajko Ostojić (Croatian pronunciation: [rǎːjko ôstojitɕ]; born 19 February 1962) is a Croatian physician and politician. A member of the Social Democratic Party (SDP), he has served as Deputy Speaker of the Croatian Parliament.

Ostojić graduated from the School of Medicine at the University of Zagreb and specialised gastroenterology and hepatology.

He first became involved in politics in 2000 when he was appointed assistant to health minister Ana Stavljenić-Rukavina, and later served a term in the 6th Sabor assembly from 2008 to 2011. Following the November 2011 election won by the centre-left Kukuriku coalition Ostojić became Croatia's Health Minister in the cabinet of Zoran Milanović in December that year.
