= Irena Hrstić =

Croatian politician (born 1969)

Minister of Health
- Incumbent
- Assumed office 6 December 2024
- Prime Minister: Andrej Plenković
- Preceded by: Vili Beroš

Personal details
- Born: 28 October 1969 (age 56) Pula, SR Croatia, SFR Yugoslavia (modern Croatia)
- Party: Croatian Democratic Union
- Education: Faculty of Medicine, University of Zagreb

Irena Hrstić (born 28 October 1969) is a Croatian politician of the Croatian Democratic Union serving as minister of health since 2024.

== Life ==
Irena Hrstić graduated from the Faculty of Medicine in Zagreb in 1995. She then completed her residency in gastroenterology at University Hospital Centre Zagreb and specialized in internal medicine. At 33, she was the youngest gastroenterologist in Croatia. She practiced until 2012 and then took on a management role at Pula Hospital.

From July to December 2024, she served as a secretary of state of the Ministry of Health. She is the leader of the Croatian Democratic Union in Pula and was a candidate for prefect of Istria in the 2021 local elections.
