= Stjepan Horvat =

Croatian geodesist and professor

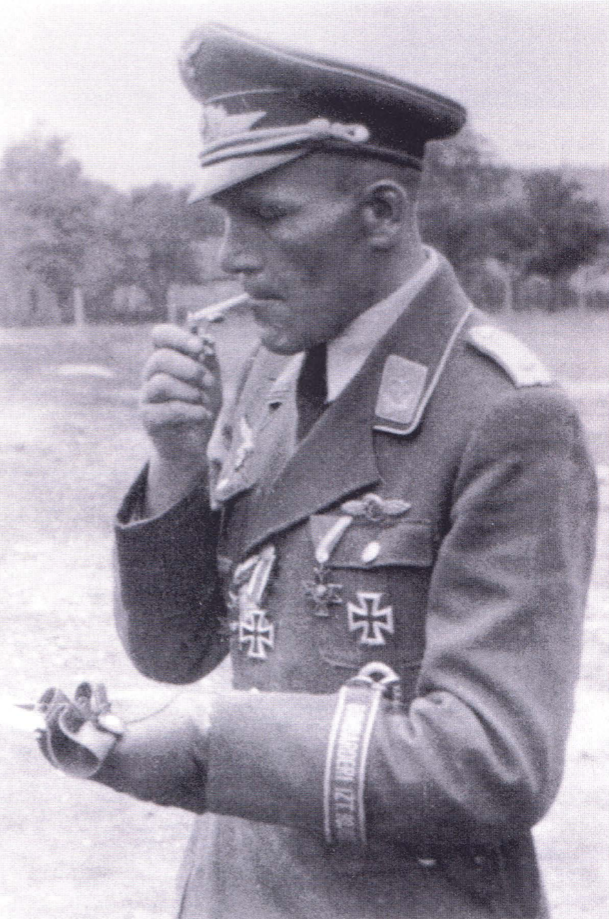
- Stjepan Horvat wearing the Iron Cross and the Honour Roll Clasp as an Air Force lieutenant in Zagreb, 1942
- Born: November 29, 1895; Karlowitz, Kingdom of Croatia-Slavonia, Austria-Hungary (now Sremski Karlovci, Vojvodina, Serbia)
- Died: March 12, 1985 (aged 89); Buenos Aires, Argentina
- Occupations: airman, military officer, geodesist, professor

Stjepan Horvat (November 29, 1895 – March 12, 1985) was a Croatian geodesist and professor, dean of the Technical Faculty in Zagreb, head of the University of Zagreb, editor of the journals Geodetski list and Hrvatska državna izmjera, manager of the Department for State Survey in the Croatian Headquarters for Public Affairs, member of the State Land Consolidation Commission, Air Force officer in the time of the Nazi-puppet state Independent State of Croatia, adviser at the Military-Geography Institute in Argentina for 40 years and an honorary member of the Argentine Association of Geophysicists.

== Life and career ==
Horvat was born in Sremski Karlovci, Austria-Hungary on 29 November 1895, he finished classical gymnasium in Vinkovci in 1915. In the same year, he enrolled in a geodetic course in Zagreb, in 1918 he passed the geodetic state examination. In 1936 he graduated from the Department of Geodesy and Engineering at the Technical Faculty in Zagreb. As a surveyor, he entered the service of the Supervision of Cadastral Survey in Zagreb in 1919. From 1920 to 1922 he worked at the Military Geographical Institute in Belgrade in the Astronomical and Geodetic Department. In 1923, he opened a civil geodetic office in Zemun. In 1926 he transferred to the Zagreb Technical Faculty as an assistant to the Chair for lower geodesy, and in 1930 he became a full-time teacher. In 1937 he became an associate professor and head of the Geodetic Authority and in 1941 a full professor.

=== Independent State of Croatia ===
During World War Two, he served as natporučnik (lieutenant) in a bomber group of the Croatian Air Force Legion, a unit of the Luftwaffe made of Croatian volunteers serving Nazi-Germany. He was decorated with the Iron cross for merits and personal courage, and received the Honour Roll Clasp. The Croatian Air Force Legion was disbanded on 21 July 1944, the same year Stjepan Horvat was appointed rector of the University of Zagreb.

In the final months of the war, as rector of the University, Horvat participated in a mass rally where he gave a speech in support of the Croatian fascist Ustaše regime. Throughout the war, the Ustaše regime carried out government-led collaboration with the Nazis exterminating hundreds of thousands of Serbs, Jews, and Gypsies in the largest concentration camps, after the Nazi camps. Behind Horvat, while he gave his speech, stood members of the government, members of the Croatian National Parliament, representatives of the Ustaše movement and representatives of the Croatian Armed Forces.

=== Exile to Argentina ===
With the end of the war, Horvat fled Croatia. He took the rector's chain with him on his departure from the country. He left the chain at the Pontifical Croatian College of St. Jerome in Rome for safekeeping during his time in Italy. The chain was originally a gift to the university by Emperor Franz Joseph I in 1877. Horvat emigrated to Argentina, alongside Ante Pavelić, Dinko Šakić and other Ustaše leaders, who benefited from the ratlines. In Argentina Horvat found a job with the Institutio Geográfico Militar Argentino (Military Geographical Institute of Argentina) becoming Esteban Horvat.

After the arrival, more than 50 scientific papers of him were published by the IGM, Argentine Association of Geophysicists and Geodesists, Pan-American Institute for Geography and History, and Direction for Geodesy of the Province of Buenos Aires, besides many other papers published in his mother country. Horvat's research interests chiefly deal with the adjustment computations of geodetic networks, general as well as geodetic cartography, ellipsoid geometry, and the development of feasible methods for automatic computation. Horvat is noted as the first person to use hyperbolic functions to ease and simplify problems of numeric calculations in the field of geodetic cartography.

Horvat is also noted as an amateur musician - he wrote Ave Maria, Adoration of the Lord (Croatian: Odanost Gospodinu), Ode to the Death (Croatian: Oda Smrti) and numerous other highly complex Croatian compositions which were performed by the choir Jadran he instituted in Argentina. To the honour of Croatian archbishop and martyr Alojzije Stepinac he composed a mass Beata Mariae Virginis. Mixed choir Jadran performed a concert in Rome in 1946 as Concerto di Musiche Nazionali Croate, conducted by Horvat who for this occasion harmonised ten folk songs from Bosnia—Dalla fiera Bosnia, and six folk songs from his native Srijem—I suoni dell'Oriente Croato. That concert received praise by music critics and was taped to a gramophone record.

=== Death and legacy ===
He died in Buenos Aires on March 12, 1985, and was buried there. Argentine Association of Geophysicists and Geodesists proclaims him honorary member in 1979. During the 22nd Conference of Geophysicists and Geodesists held in Buenos Aires 6–11 September 2004, a memorial plate to Stjepan Horvat was revealed in the entrance space of the Military-Geography institute.

With democratic changes in Croatia in 1991, the Pontifical Croatian College of St. Jerome returned Horvat's chain to the university. The University of Zagreb rehabilitated Horvat from the Communist period and restored his rector's picture on November 3, 1994.

== Notes ==
Academic offices
Preceded by Božidar Špišić	Rector of the University of Zagreb; 1944 – 1945	Succeeded by Andrija Štampar
