= Croatian Dawn – Party of the People =

Croatian Dawn - Party of People Hrvatska zora - Stranka naroda
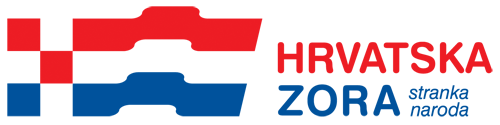
- President: Milan Kujundžić
- Founded: 20 July 2013
- Dissolved: 2016
- Split from: Croatian Democratic Union
- Headquarters: Zagreb, Croatia
- Ideology: Right-wing populism Croatian nationalism
- Political position: Right-wing
- Seats in Sabor: 0 / 153
- European Parliament: 0 / 11

Croatian Dawn – Party of the People (Croatian: Hrvatska zora - Stranka naroda) was a minor Croatian conservative political party established in July 2013. Party's founder and leader was Milan Kujundžić.

The founding assembly of the Party was held on 20 July 2013 in Zagreb. Milan Kujundžić was elected as first president, while Milan Petrak was elected for his deputy.

On February 5, 2014, Croatia dawn joined Alliance for Croatia, which was dissolved in 2015 due to poor election results.

In August 2016, Milan Kujundžić returned to the HDZ, and most party members followed. The party was removed from the Registry of Political Parties in the same year.

== Electoral history ==
=== Legislative ===
Election	In coalition with	Votes won (coalition totals)	Percentage	Seats won	Change	Government
2015	None	4,487	0.20%	0 / 151	Steady	Extraparliamentary

=== European Parliament ===
Election	In coalition with	Votes won (coalition totals)	Percentage	Seats won	Change
2014	Alliance for Croatia	63,437	6.88%	0 / 11	Steady

=== President of Croatia ===
Election	Candidate	Rank	1st round votes	% of votes	Rank	2nd round votes	% of votes
2014-15	Milan Kujundžić	4th	112,585	6.30%	—	—	—
