= 2014–15 Croatian presidential election =

← 2009–10	28 December 2014 (first round); 11 January 2015 (second round)	2019–20 →
- Turnout: 47.10% (first round), 59.03% (second round)
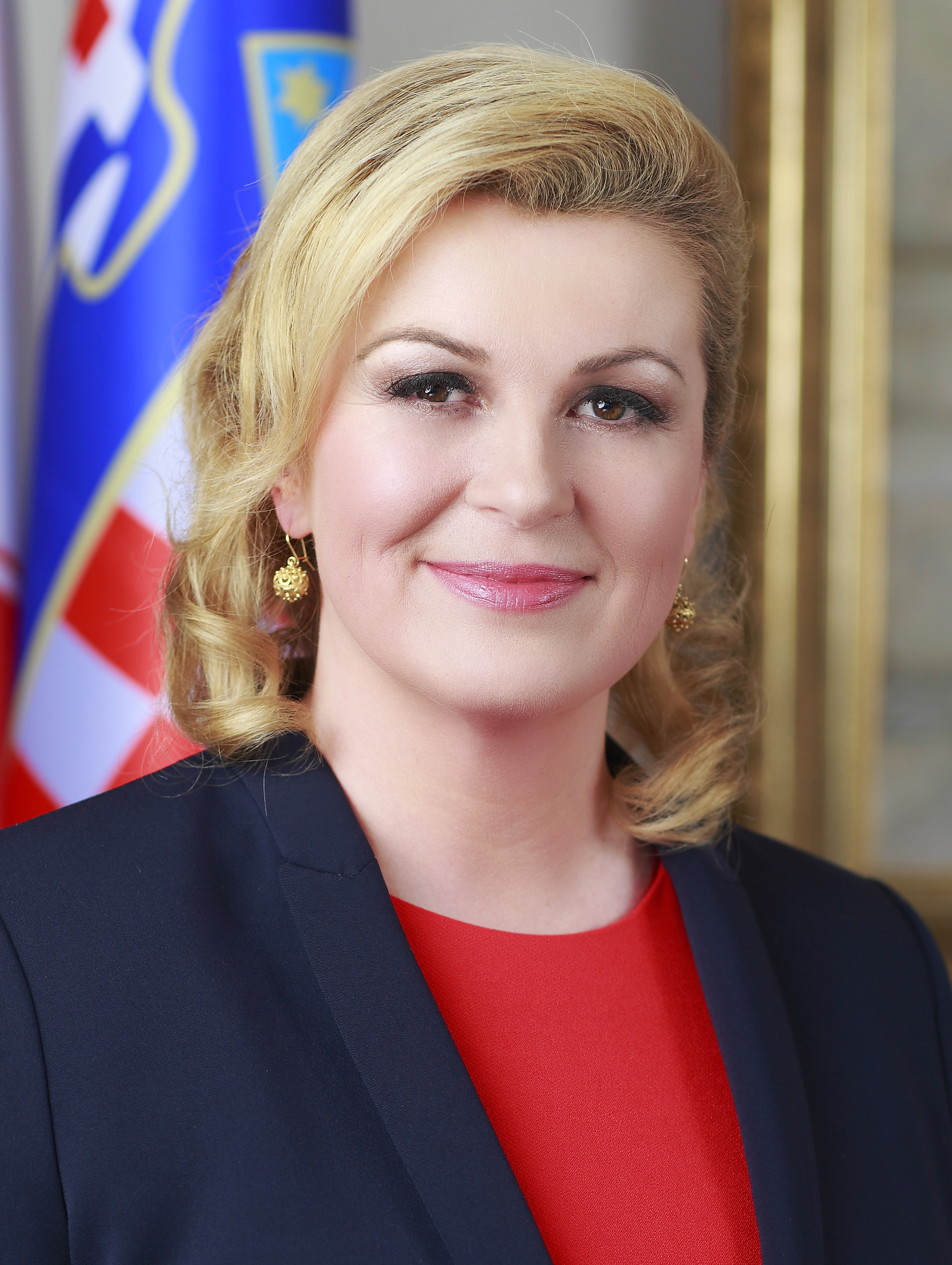

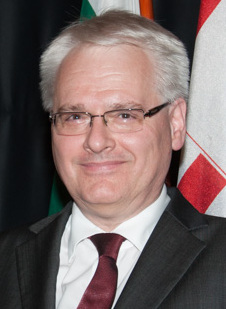
Nominee	Kolinda Grabar-Kitarović	Ivo Josipović
Party	HDZ	Independent (SDP)
Popular vote	1,114,945	1,082,436
Percentage	50.74%	49.26%
- Second round results by municipality
President before election
Ivo Josipović
Independent
Elected President
Kolinda Grabar-Kitarović
HDZ

Presidential elections were held in Croatia on 28 December 2014 and 11 January 2015, the sixth such elections since independence in 1991. Only four candidates contested the elections, the lowest number since 1997. Incumbent president Ivo Josipović, who had been elected as the candidate of the Social Democratic Party in 2009–2010, was eligible to seek reelection for a second and final five-year term and ran as an independent. As no candidate received 50% of the vote in the first round in December 2014, a run-off took place in January 2015 between the two candidates with the most votes, Josipović and Kolinda Grabar-Kitarović. Grabar-Kitarović went on to win the elections by a slim margin of 32,509 votes or 1.48%, making her Croatia's first female president.

The elections were the second to have a woman in the run-off, the first having been the 2005 elections, and also featured the youngest candidate to run in a presidential contest, Ivan Vilibor Sinčić, aged 24. The election of Grabar-Kitarović was the first victory for the Croatian Democratic Union (HDZ) in a presidential election since the death of Franjo Tuđman in December 1999, making her the first right-wing President of Croatia in 15 years. The defeat of Josipović marked the first time that an incumbent Croatian President had failed to win reelection for a second five-year term, with both his predecessors Franjo Tuđman and Stjepan Mesić serving two terms. The number of votes (1,114,900) received by Grabar-Kitarović in the second round was the lowest number of votes received by an elected Croatian President until that point in time (later being surpassed by the number of votes for Zoran Milanović in the 2019-20 election). Grabar-Kitarović was sworn in as the fourth President of Croatia on 15 February 2015, becoming the youngest person to take office as President of the Republic of Croatia, aged 46 years and 295 days.

== Background and rules ==
In mid-October 2014 the SDP-led government proposed adopting a new electoral law by February 2015. SDP's parliamentary speaker Josip Leko stated that the party's position in consultation with the Venice Commission was that the electoral law should not be changed within a year prior to an election. However, the new Law on the Election of the President of the Republic of Croatia was subsequently voted in by the SDP-led parliamentary majority on 24 October. The opposition Croatian Democratic Union (HDZ) walked out on the vote criticizing the timing, while most of the parliament's minority representatives voted against the law due to a lack of consultation of parliamentary groups. The SDP's Peđa Grbin, head of the parliament's constitutional committee jeered the opposition: "I understand why my colleagues from HDZ are opposed, since they won't have to wait until midnight to find that they've also lost these elections" - ostensibly in reference to a part of the law which shortened the electoral silence from midnight on election day to the closing of the polls.

One of the more significant changes to the law involved limiting voting abroad to consular offices. This had the effect of greatly reducing the number of polling stations in neighbouring Bosnia and Herzegovina: from 124 in the 2009-10 presidential elections to 15 in the current election. The Croatian People's Assembly, a grouping of Croat parties in Bosnia and Herzegovina, protested at the reduction. Overall the number of polling stations abroad was reduced from 250 to 90.

On 20 November Croatian prime minister Zoran Milanović called presidential elections to take place on 28 December.

Opinions polls in late 2014 showed the Croatian public with high disapproval ratings of the country's direction and the government: 82% and 79% respectively.

== Campaign before the official start ==
Kolinda Grabar-Kitarović was first discussed as the Croatian Democratic Union's candidate in May 2014 after the party emerged with the most votes and seats nationally in the European Parliament elections. Her candidature was confirmed by party leader Tomislav Karamarko on 12 June.

In October Josipović had to deal with the fallout from an article written by his chief analyst Dejan Jović claiming that the 1991 Croatian independence referendum was "quite illiberal and was not held in free and honest circumstances". Josipović subsequently dismissed Jović.

== Candidates ==
Candidates seeking nomination first had to submit a minimum of 10,000 citizens' signatures to the State Electoral Commission (Državno izborno povjerenstvo or DIP) in order for their candidacy to be formally accepted. The signatures had to be collected in a period of twelve days, from 25 November to 6 December. The deadline for submissions was midnight, 6 December, with most candidates submitting a much larger number of signatures as a show of support. Following the submissions, DIP had two days to check the validity of signatures and announced a final list of candidates by midnight on 8 December. On 9 December the campaign officially started, and lasted for 18 days until 26 December, celebrated in Croatia as Saint Stephen's Day.

The first to submit his signatures was Milan Kujundžić who handed them in on 5 December. Incumbent president Ivo Josipović submitted his 203,875 signatures along with prime minister Zoran Milanović and other members of his cabinet on the day of the deadline. Kolinda Grabar-Kitarović and Ivan Sinčić both also submitted the required signatures later that day.

Candidate	Party affiliation	Political remarks	Proof of nomination	Website
Ivo Josipović	Nominally Independent, supported by the Social Democratic Party of Croatia	Incumbent, stands for re-election after completing his first term. Although formally independent, he was nominated by the Social Democratic Party of Croatia (SDP) and ran on a centre-left platform. Also supported by other members of the ruling centre-left Kukuriku coalition: the Croatian People's Party – Liberal Democrats (HNS-LD), Istrian Democratic Assembly (IDS), and the Croatian Party of Pensioners (HSU). Also supported by Croatian Labourists (HL) and Croatian Sustainable Development (ORaH).	Submitted some 203,000 signatures on 6 December.	josipovic.hr
Kolinda Grabar-Kitarović	Croatian Democratic Union	Candidate of the biggest opposition party, the centre-right Croatian Democratic Union (HDZ), and supported by other members of the centre-right opposition coalition: the Croatian Peasant Party (HSS), Croatian Social Liberal Party (HSLS), Croatian Party of Rights dr. Ante Starčević, Democratic Party of Zagorje, Croatian Growth, and Bloc Pensioners Together.. Former foreign minister in the Cabinet of Ivo Sanader I (2003–08), ran on a centre-right platform. candidacy officially confirmed on 12 June 2014.	Submitted some 330,000 signatures on 6 December.	kolinda.hr
Milan Kujundžić	Croatian Dawn	Founder and president of the right-wing populist Croatian Dawn (HZ) non-parliamentary party, formed in July 2013 as a splinter party of HDZ, following Kujundžić's defeat in internal party elections. Candidate of the Alliance for Croatia coalition of right-wing and nationalist parties. Ran on a right-wing populist platform. Candidacy officially confirmed on 18 October 2014.	Submitted some 50,000 signatures on 5 December.	milankujundzic.hr
Ivan Vilibor Sinčić	Human Blockade	Student nominated by an activist organization called Živi Zid (Human Blockade) which fights forced home evictions by organising human shields, and which was registered as a political party in July 2011. Ran on a eurosceptic, anti-NATO populist platform.	Submitted some 15,000 signatures on 6 December.	s-p.hr

=== Withdrawn candidate bids ===
- Anto Đapić withdrew on 5 December, endorsing Kolinda Grabar-Kitarović.
- Ivan Grubišić withdrew on 6 December, endorsing Ivan Rude.
- Ivan Rude, lawyer who handled pre-bankruptcy settlements at several large companies and candidate of the non-parliamentary Voice of Reason party, he ran on left-wing populist and worker's rights platform. Withdrew on 6 December after failing to collect 10,000 signatures required to formally submit his bid.

=== Failed candidacies ===
- Ivan Bavčević submitted 7,600 signatures to the electoral commission on December 6 and was rejected.
- Ratko Dobrović submitted no signatures to the electoral commission claiming that they are "blank signatures".
- Slobodan Midžić not submitted signatures on the prescribed form. Instead he offered a CD on which, as he claims, is about 500 thousand signatures. He is from Velika Kladuša (BiH). Midžić had also failed to nominate himself for 2009 presidential election.
- Ivica Dukić submitted only 800 signatures because "in Split and Zagreb it is raining and people are suspicious".
- Vesna Balenović, supported Milan Kujundžić
- Tomislav Šutalo, businessman from Valpovo
- Ivan Valek, architect and member of The Church of Jesus Christ of Latter-day Saints
- Iva Anzulović, reporter. She said that "she is apolitical and always a reporter"
- Tomislav Opačak, businessman from Slavonski Brod. At the time, he was due to serve a prison sentence for a traffic violation. He said that "there never was a great president who did not serve prison time", mentioning Josip Broz Tito and Franjo Tuđman.

== Campaign ==
During the course of the first-round campaign the head of the president's War Veterans Council Vlado Marić gave his resignation in protest of Josipović. His resignation cited a lack of an "appropriate reaction to multiple attempts to show either [Josipović] or his close associates, personally or through the War Veterans Council, of the difficulty and seriousness of the problems affecting Croatian veterans".

Incumbent president Ivo Josipović addressed his supporters on the night of the first round of elections. During his speech he stated "Too much blood has been spilled for Croatia and too many defenders died that we would give Croatia up to those who don't deserve it" in reference to the opposition challenger Grabar-Kitarović. The Croatian Democratic Union criticized the president's rhetoric as "dirty and aggressive" and stressed that while Josipović "speaks of blood", their candidate offers "peace, unity and optimism".

After the first round, third place candidate Ivan Sinčić was asked which of the two candidates he would support in the second round to which he replied that he could not support either due to moral reasons. Sinčić's Živi zid told his supporters to spoil their ballots in the second round by entering Sinčić's name on the ballot. Vice-president of the SDP government Milanka Opačić called Sinčić a "colourful lie" in an interview from the Josipović campaign headquarters on the night of the first-round elections. In response Sinčić's campaign manager Dušan Cvetanović called SDP and the government "a colourful lie which ever fewer people have faith in". SDP vice-president and director of operations for Josipović's campaign Željka Antunović also said that "Sinčić acted like an anarchist and didn't offer solutions". Nevertheless, the following day Josipović reached out to Sinčić's voters: "I hope that those voters who were for Sinčić recognize that this is a field where we're playing together". Sinčić continued his work with Živi zid after the first round. He was arrested during an attempt to prevent an eviction in Zagreb on 8 January.

Fourth placed candidate Milan Kujundžić implicitly endorsed Grabar-Kitarović during his concession speech on the first-round election night stating that "Croatia will get a new president". The Croatian Party of Rights which had backed Kujundžić subsequently endorsed Grabar-Kitarović.

Grabar-Kitarović entered the second round as only the second woman to do so after Jadranka Kosor in 2005, and attempting to be the first to win the presidency. In prime minister Milanović's new-year interview with RTL he referred to her as a "prima ballerina" in the previous HDZ government when she served as minister. In the interview Milanović also referred to Croatian Catholic bishops as "the most backward in Europe" and referred to Orthodox Christmas as the only non-working day in the coming weeks, despite Ephipany being celebrated as a national non-working holiday on 6 January and Orthodox Christmas being an optional non-working holiday reserved for those Orthodox observing it.

Josipović continued with some events in his presidential role during the campaign. On 6 January he was to attend the Serbian National Council's Christmas party. Traditionally, the event is attended by the president although Josipović had last been in 2012 after a falling-out with the head of the council Milorad Pupovac.

=== Campaign spending ===
Candidate (Party)	Amount spent: until December 28	Votes	Average spent per vote
Ivo Josipović (SDP supported)	5,400,000	687,558	7.8
Kolinda Grabar-Kitarović (HDZ)	2,500,000	665,309	3.8
Milan Kujundžić (SZH)	390,806	112,581	3.5
Ivan Sinčić (Živi zid)	92,627	293,562	0.32

=== Debates - Second round ===
Grabar-Kitarović and Josipović were scheduled to have three head-to-head debates before the second round:

- RTL Televizija - Sunday January 4. The debate was watched by over 805,000 people.
- Nova TV - Thursday January 8
- Croatian Radiotelevision - Friday January 9

== Opinion polls ==
=== First round ===
Date(s) Conducted	Polling Organisation/Client	Ivo Josipović	Kolinda Grabar-Kitarović	Milan Kujundžić	Ivan Sinčić	Others	Undecided / none
28 Dec	Exit polls	38.8%	38.1%	5.7%	15.9%		
22 Dec	2x1 komunikacije	40.48%	42.48%	12.90%	4.04%		
19 Dec	Ipsos plus for Novatv	46.5%	34.9%	7.2%	9.2%		
18 Dec	Promocija Plus for RTL	42.1%	30.5%	9.3%	7.5%		10.6%
4 Dec	Promocija plus for RTL	42.3%	28.3%	11.2%		9.5%	8.7%
6 Sep	Promocija plus	48.9%	32.5%	6.8%			
4 Sep	Ipsos puls	45.5%	30.9%	2.1%		9.4%	12.1%
4 Aug	Promocija plus	48.4%	33.6%	4.8%		3.2%	10.0%
1–3 Jul	Promocija plus	49.2%	35.2%	4.3%		1.8%	9.4%
June	Promocija plus	50.1%	29.2%	6.2%		4.8%	9.6%
June	Ipsos puls	50.3%	37.3%				12.4%
May	Promocija plus	52.5%	27.0%	6.1%		5.9%	8.6%
April	Promocija plus	51.6%	27.2%	4.5%		8.6%	8.2%
March	Promocija plus	52.2%	28.4%			8.8%	10.7%
February	Promocija plus	54.0%	24.0%			10.3%	11.7%
January	Promocija plus	51.7%	17.4%			19.9%	11.0%

=== Second round ===
Date(s) Conducted	Polling Organisation/Client	Ivo Josipović	Kolinda Grabar-Kitarović	Undecided
11 Jan	Exit polls	48.6%	51.4%	0%
7 Jan	2x1 komunikacije	47.7%	52.3%	0%
18 Dec	Promocija Plus for RTL	52.0%	41.3%	6.7%
4 Dec	Promocija plus for RTL	50.9%	41.4%	7.7%

== Conduct ==
- Candidate's observers - first round:
  - Kolinda Grabar-Kitarović - 9,700
  - Ivo Josipović - 8,728
  - Milan Kujundžić - 1,875
  - Ivan Sinčić - 362
- Political parties' observers - first round:
  - Sustainable Development of Croatia (endorsing Josipović) - 191
  - Croatian Peasant Party (endorsing Grabar-Kitarović) - 52
  - Croatian People's Party (endorsing Josipović) - 17
- Non-governmental observers - first round:
  - In the Name of the Family - 682
  - Observer (Promatrač) organization - 53
  - Student Catholic Centre Palma - 39
  - GONG - 15
  - Croatian Responsible Society - 5
- Non-governmental observers - second round:
  - In the Name of the Family - 845
  - Observer (Promatrač) organization - 53
  - GONG - 15
  - Croatian Responsible Society - 5

== Results ==
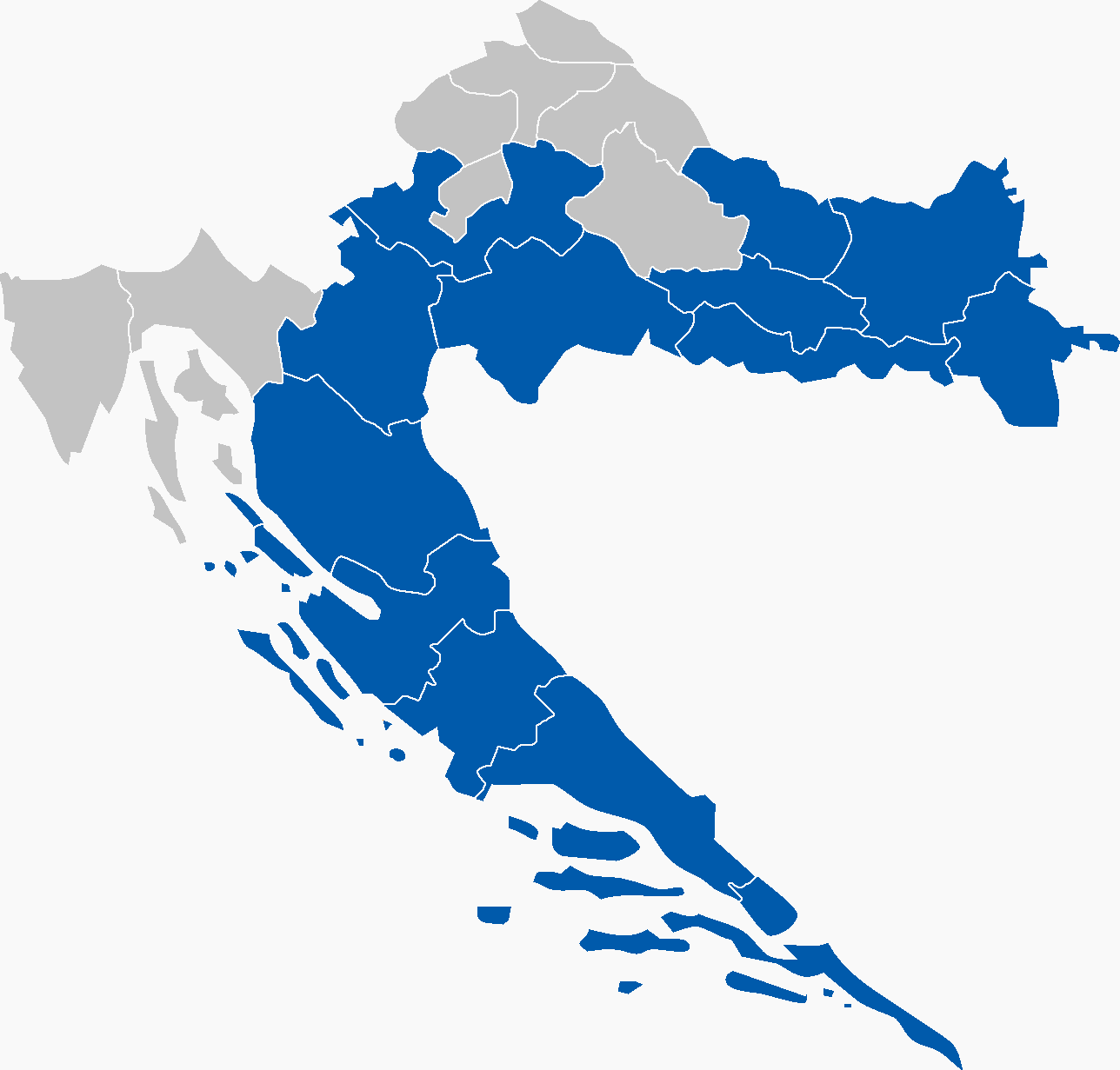
Results of the first round in all of Croatia's counties: the candidate with the plurality of votes in each administrative division. Josipović Grabar-Kitarović

Candidate	Party	First round		Second round	
Candidate	Party	Votes	%	Votes	%
Ivo Josipović	Independent (SDP)	687,678	39.09	1,082,436	49.26
Kolinda Grabar-Kitarović	Croatian Democratic Union	665,379	37.82	1,114,945	50.74
Ivan Vilibor Sinčić	Human Shield	293,570	16.69		
Milan Kujundžić	Alliance for Croatia	112,585	6.40		
Total		1,759,212	100.00	2,197,381	100.00
Valid votes		1,759,212	98.44	2,197,381	97.31
Invalid/blank votes		27,791	1.56	60,728	2.69
Total votes		1,787,003	100.00	2,258,109	100.00
Registered voters/turnout		3,794,293	47.10	3,825,242	59.03
Source: Izbori Hrvatska

=== First round results by county ===
County	Electorate	Total votes	Turnout	Josipović		Grabar-Kitarović		Sinčić		Kujundžić	
County	Electorate	Total votes	Turnout	Votes	%	Votes	%	Votes	%	Votes	%
Bjelovar-Bilogora	101,494	45,071	44.41%	17,602	39.05%	16,652	36.94%	7,906	17.54%	2,371	5.26%
Brod-Posavina	140,575	66,164	47.07%	21,194	32.03%	29,811	45.05%	10,609	16.03%	3,478	5.26%
Dubrovnik-Neretva	108,910	53,412	49.04%	18,263	34.19%	22,205	41.57%	8,026	15.02%	3,994	7.38%
Istria	188,659	85,335	45.23%	52,966	62.05%	12,148	14.23%	17,144	20.08%	1,869	2.19%
Karlovac	115,725	56,420	48.75%	19,140	33.92%	24,142	42.78%	10,025	17.77%	2,445	4.33%
Koprivnica-Križevci	95,289	43,822	45.99%	18,287	41.72%	15,193	34.66%	7,689	17.54%	2,123	4.84%
Krapina-Zagorje	109,617	45,720	41.71%	18,220	39.85%	16,306	35.66%	8,555	18.71%	2,011	4.40%
Lika-Senj	46,741	21,701	46.43%	5,678	26.16%	12,171	56.06%	2,202	10.14%	1,394	6.42%
Međimurje	96,394	46,612	48.36%	27,630	59.27%	9,627	20.65%	7,458	16.00%	1,413	3.03%
Osijek-Baranja	261,730	118,379	45.23%	40,380	34.09%	47,279	39.91%	22,451	18.95%	6,754	5.70%
Požega-Slavonia	67,852	35,880	52.88%	12,555	34.99%	15,342	42.75%	5,298	14.76%	2,181	6.08%
Primorje-Gorski Kotar	268,824	119,107	44.31%	58,280	48.91%	34,882	29.27%	20,676	17.35%	3,490	2.93%
Sisak-Moslavina	152,358	64,487	42.33%	23,002	35.66%	26,201	40.62%	10,533	16.33%	3,972	6.16%
Split-Dalmatia	408,023	204,869	50.21%	61,441	29.96%	80,732	39.37%	31,194	15.21%	27,980	13.65%
Šibenik-Knin	104,976	48,340	46.05%	15,165	35.46%	21,763	45.00%	6,913	14.30%	3,736	7.73%
Varaždin	146,489	70,790	48.32%	35,589	50.26%	19,286	27.24%	12,682	17.91%	2,282	3.22%
Virovitica-Podravina	72,864	34,841	47.82%	12,577	36.09%	15,002	43.04%	5,101	14.64%	1,685	4.83%
Vukovar-Syrmia	158,872	70,673	44.48%	21,705	30.70%	35,013	49.52%	10,120	14.31%	2,837	4.01%
Zadar	165,454	71,178	43.02%	23,630	33.18%	30,766	43.20%	10,831	15.21%	4,722	6.63%
Zagreb County	272,633	128,111	46.99%	47,104	36.75%	47,287	36.90%	23,714	18.50%	7,917	6.18%
City of Zagreb	690,208	335,490	48.61%	134,915	40.17%	117,673	35.04%	53,821	16.03%	22,332	6.65%
Voting abroad	–	20,601	–	2,355	11.43%	15,898	77.15%	1,649	8.00%	622	3.02%
TOTAL	3,794,293	1,787,928	47.12%	687,678	38.46%	665,379	37.22%	293,570	16.42%	112,585	6.30%
Source: State Electoral Commission

=== Second round results by county ===
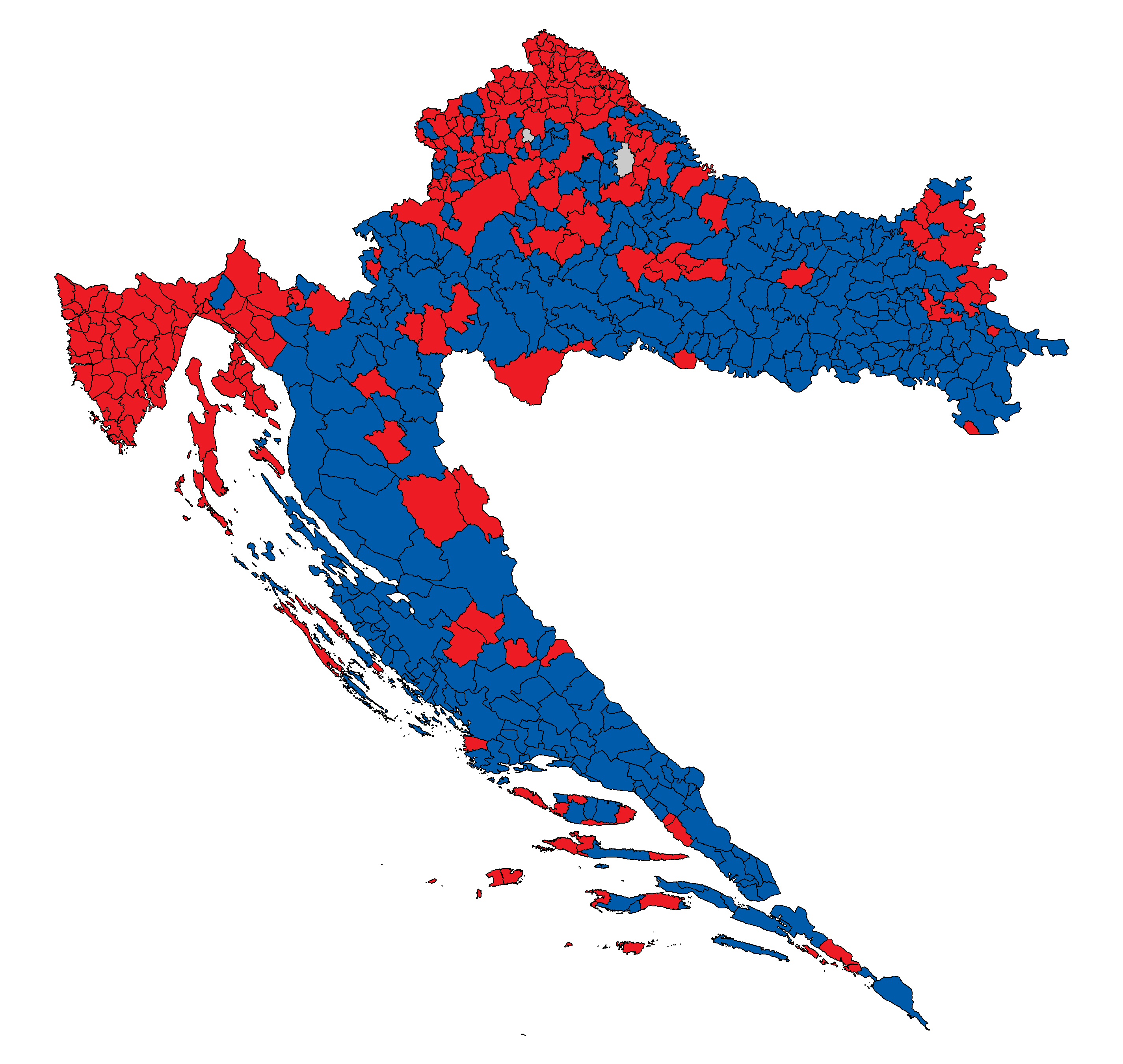
Results of the election based on the majority of votes in each municipality of Croatia Kolinda Grabar-Kitarović Ivo Josipović Tie

Results by municipality, shaded according to winning candidate's percentage of the vote. Grabar-Kitarović—>90% Grabar-Kitarović—80–90% Grabar-Kitarović—70–80% Grabar-Kitarović—60–70% Grabar-Kitarović—50–60% Tie Josipović—50–60% Josipović—60–70% Josipović—70–80% Josipović—80–90% Josipović—>90%

County	Electorate	Total votes	Turnout	Grabar-Kitarović		Josipović	
County	Electorate	Total votes	Turnout	Votes	%	Votes	%
Bjelovar-Bilogora	101,897	58,988	57.89%	28,846	50.11%	28,722	49.89%
Brod-Posavina	141,045	77,573	55.00%	44,928	59.59%	30,470	40.41%
Dubrovnik-Neretva	109,308	65,029	59.49%	36,641	57.97%	26,566	42.03%
Istria	189,129	105,618	55.84%	21,152	20.53%	81,888	79.47%
Karlovac	116,112	69,849	60.16%	38,072	55.92%	30,017	44.08%
Koprivnica-Križevci	95,720	56,262	58.78%	25,579	46.57%	29,344	53.43%
Krapina-Zagorje	110,082	65,029	59.07%	29,758	47.05%	33,492	52.95%
Lika-Senj	46,979	27,695	58.95%	18,230	67.11%	8,933	32.89%
Međimurje	96,666	57,884	59.88%	15,581	27.40%	41,283	72.60%
Osijek-Baranja	262,467	149,631	57.01%	77,823	53.50%	67,638	46.50%
Požega-Slavonia	68,143	41,435	60.81%	22,780	56.37%	17,631	43.63%
Primorje-Gorski Kotar	269,622	150,206	55.71%	56,153	38.33%	90,361	61.67%
Sisak-Moslavina	152,890	84,233	55.09%	44,079	53.72%	37,967	46.28%
Split-Dalmatia	410,038	248,000	60.48%	149,531	62.12%	91,174	37.88%
Šibenik-Knin	105,511	58,894	55.82%	33,876	59.07%	23,475	40.93%
Varaždin	147,026	90,116	61.29%	31,440	35.77%	56,443	64.23%
Virovitica-Podravina	73,188	44,771	61.17%	23,339	53.50%	20,287	46.50%
Vukovar-Syrmia	159,514	88,558	55.52%	51,443	59.49%	35,024	40.51%
Zadar	166,194	87,358	52.56%	49,733	58.54%	35,226	41.46%
Zagreb County	273,728	163,479	59.72%	81,651	51.49%	76,914	48.51%
City of Zagreb	692,780	430,308	62.11%	200,573	48.11%	216,290	51.89%
Voting abroad	–	37,193	–	33,737	91.11%	3,291	8.89%
TOTAL	3,825,242	2,258,109	59.03%	1,114,945	50.74%	1,082,436	49.26%
Source: State Electoral Commission

== Analysis ==
Incumbent president Ivo Josipović and opposition candidate Kolinda Grabar-Kitarović received the greatest number of votes in the first round. The result was notable for being much closer than expected in pre-election polls, with respective vote shares of 38.46% and 37.22%. Political analyst Žarko Puhovski criticized the polls for having an inadequate sample and being overly reliant on telephone polling.

The new electoral law put into place by the Milanović government had the effect of greatly reducing the number of polling stations in neighbouring Bosnia and Herzegovina for Croatian citizens residing there. This translated to a greatly reduced turnout there: from 50,859 in the first round of the 2009 presidential elections to 7,372 in 2014. The Croatian Democratic Union agreed with its sister party in Bosnia and Herzegovina on organizing free buses for voters to polling stations for the second round. Kolinda Grabar-Kitarović had received an overwhelming majority there in the first round. Josipović's campaign complained to the State Electoral Commission that offering free rides to polling stations constituted a donation which would violate electoral rules. However, votes of the diaspora still wouldn't change the outcome.

Around 60% of voters between ages 18 and 29 voted for Grabar-Kitarović, while Josipović was favoured by voters older than 60.
