= Sisters of Charity Hospital (Zagreb) =

Sisters of Charity University Hospital
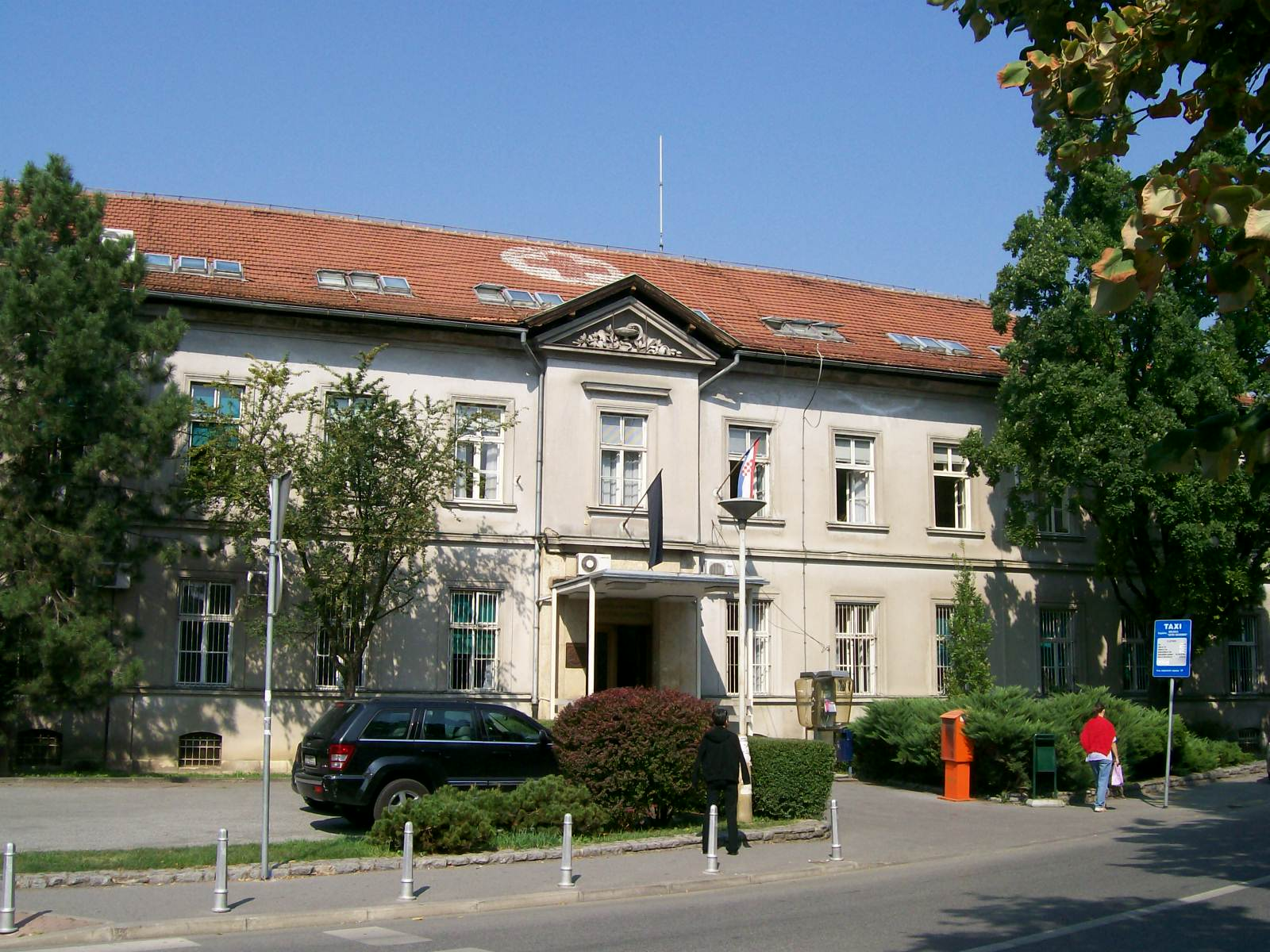
- Main entrance

Geography
- Location: Vinogradska 29, Zagreb, Croatia
- Coordinates: 45°48′53″N 15°57′11″E

Organisation
- Care system: Publicly funded health care
- Type: Teaching
- Affiliated university: University of Zagreb

Services
- Emergency department: Yes
- Beds: 853

History
- Founded: 1846. Current site 1894

Links
- Website: http://www.kbcsm.hr
- Lists: Hospitals in Croatia

The teaching hospital Sisters of Charity (Croatian: Klinički bolnički centar Sestre milosrdnice) in Zagreb, Croatia, is one of the oldest hospitals in southern Europe.

== History ==
The hospital was established in 1846, through the initiative of Cardinal Juraj Haulik, the Archbishop of Zagreb. It changed locations a number of times until a permanent hospital campus was completed in 1894 by the German architect Kuno Waidmann, on the site of the former Villa Socias and a neighbouring graveyard in Vinogradska Street.

It was run by the Sisters of Charity from 1894 until 1948. The Emperor Franz Joseph visited the hospital in 1895.

The Sisters continued to run the hospital until it was confiscated after World War II. Thereafter it was nationalized by the Communist government (in 1948) and renamed the Dr. Mladen Stojanović Hospital. The original name was restored in 1992, but the government retained its ownership. It is now operated under the Ministry of Health.

== Activities ==
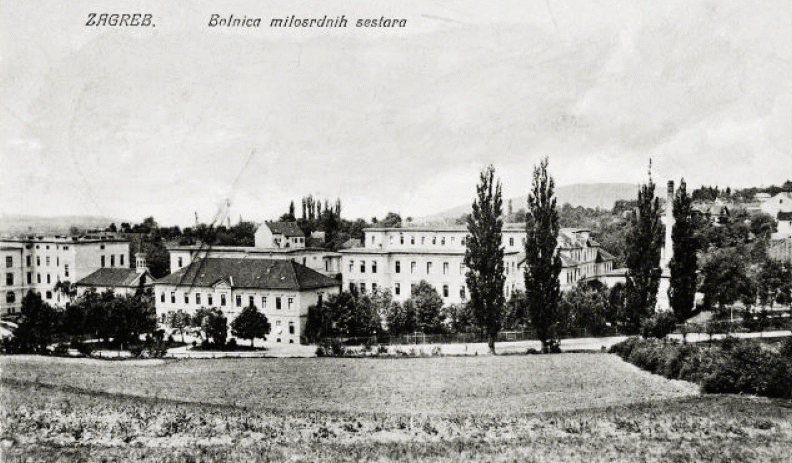
Sisters of Charity Hospital, end of the 19th century

As of 2022, the hospital consists of 17 clinics and 7 specialized institutes, with a total of 853 beds and 2,334 employees in one campus. The hospital is an educational facility for institutes of higher education, i.e., the medical and dental schools, as well as a nursing school.

Main Campus of the hospital is based in Vinogradska Street and was built in 1894, with the Oncology Department and Accident and Emergency (A&E) and Trauma Clinics currently based off-campus. The hospital is a level 1 trauma center, one of three such hospitals in Zagreb, the other being the University Hospital Centre and the Clinical Hospital Dubrava.

Its Trauma and A&E departments are based in Draškovićeva Street. The 120 bed facility is considered too small to cater for the needs of Zagreb, so often other hospital take the bulk of A&E patients.

The Oncology Clinic and the Clinic for Tumours is located in Ilica street. The Clinic has around 150 beds and is considered to be the leading oncology clinic in Croatia.

== Future plans ==
The hospital is the oldest hospital in Croatia, currently serving much of Western Zagreb and Zagreb County's acute oncological patients. Many of its buildings were built before World War 2 and lack modern facilities offered by newer similarly sized hospitals. Current central campus consist of about a dozen disjointed buildings erected on an ad-hock basis without serious consideration for long term planning or access to facilities by ever growing population, the complex itself being around 50,000 m^{2}.

Due to the 2020 Zagreb earthquake, and to a lesser extent the 2020 Petrinja earthquake, which damaged the central hospital complex, the Health Ministry proposed a plan to expand and modernise the central campus dramatically by demolishing older structures and in their place building modern, energy sustainable buildings.

Expansion plans envisions knocking down a number of old buildings and building number of new energy efficient buildings in its place, in total 10 larger modern buildings are planned, at least doubling the total hospital area to around ~100 000sqm, with Trauma clinic also relocating to the central campus. Planned expansion already started with several old buildings knocked down and new structures being erected. Construction and expansion of the hospital will be executed in 3 phases over next 10 years with final phase seeing a construction of 1000 car multi store garage.

== See also ==
- Črnomerec
- Kuno Waidmann
