= Vili Beroš =

Croatian politician (born 1964)

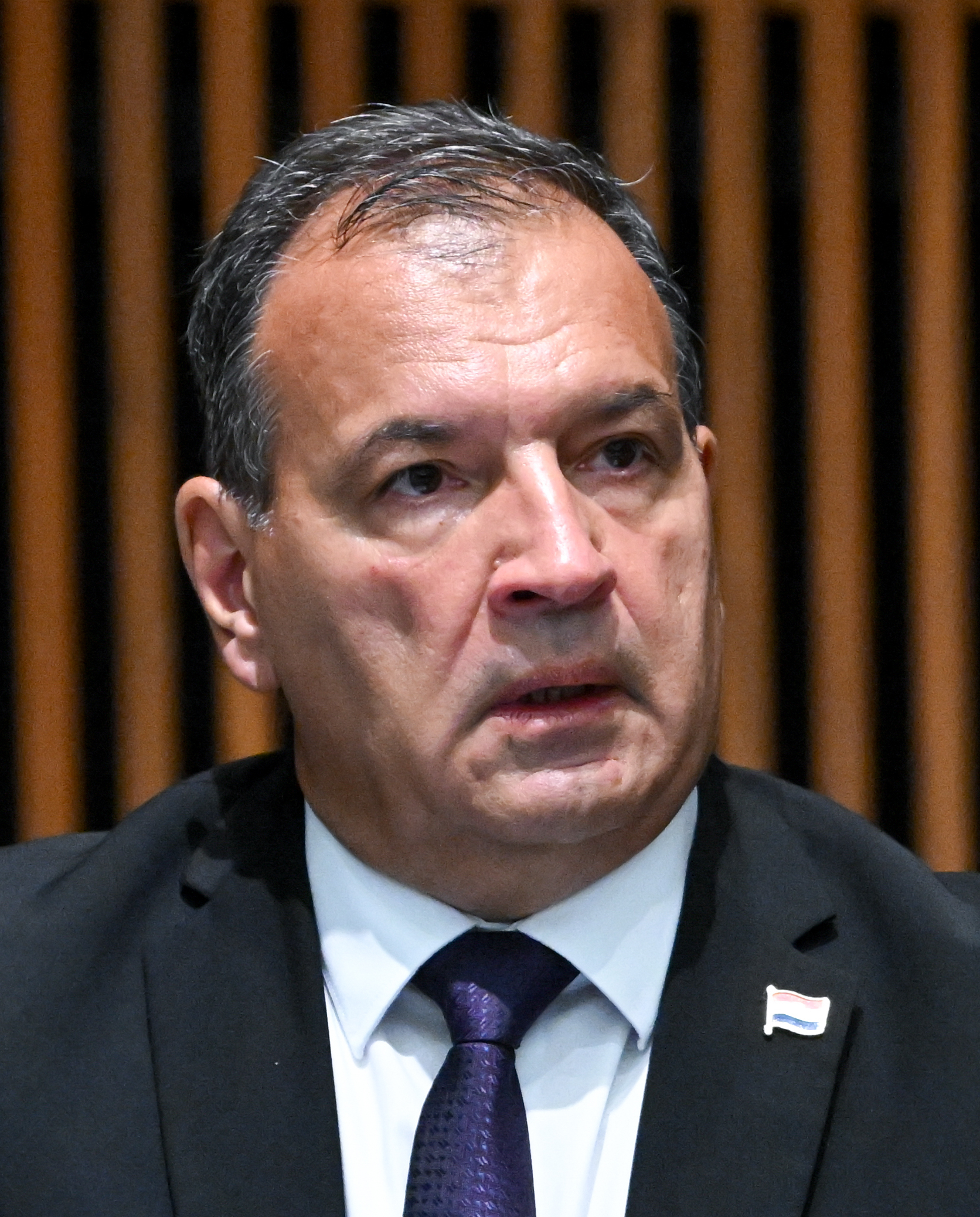
- Beroš in 2024

Minister of Health
- In office 31 January 2020 – 15 November 2024
- Prime Minister: Andrej Plenković
- Preceded by: Milan Kujundžić
- Succeeded by: Irena Hrstić

Personal details
- Born: 13 December 1964 (age 61) Split, SR Croatia, SFR Yugoslavia
- Party: Croatian Democratic Union
- Spouse: Jasminka Beroš (m. 2000)
- Children: 2
- Education: University of Zagreb
- Occupation: Politician, neurosurgeon
- Profession: Neurosurgery

Vili Beroš (pronounced [ʋîːli běːroʃ]; born 13 December 1964) is a Croatian politician and neurosurgeon who served as Minister of Health from 2020 to 2024.

On 19 November 2020, it was announced that Beroš had tested positive for the COVID-19 amid its pandemic in Croatia.

His tenure as minister has been marked by efforts to deal with the COVID-19 pandemic in Croatia, which, as of March 2021, has affected over 150,000 people in Croatia. Croatia had also been presided over the Council of the European Union between January and June 2020, which occasionally entailed holding meetings of ministers of health from all 27 member states of the European Union, which are chaired by the minister from the presiding country.

Beroš was arrested and dismissed on 15 November 2024 due to a corruption investigation led by USKOK. He is accused by USKOK of charges that include bribery, money laundering, abuse of authority and influence peddling.

Beroš was also under an investigation led by EPPO for the same actions taken, but was also investigated for criminal conspiracy. Attorney general Ivan Turudić declared that USKOK has the jurisdiction for this case, thus currently EPPO is forced to hand out all evidence to USKOK.
