= Clinical Hospital Dubrava =

Coordinates: 45°50′4″N 16°2′6″E

Klinička bolnica Dubrava

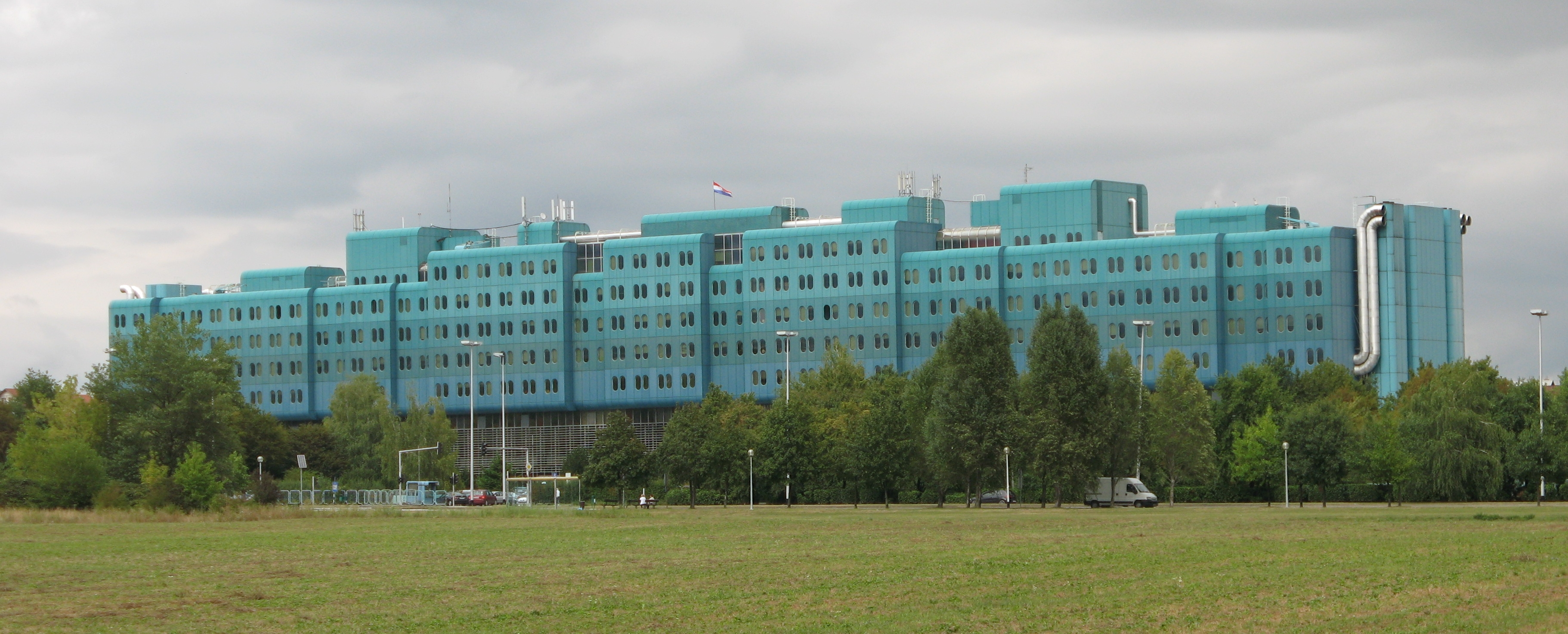
- Clinical Hospital "Dubrava"

Geography
- Location: Avenija Gojka Šuška 6, Zagreb, Croatia

Organisation
- Care system: HZZO
- Type: District general
- Affiliated university: University of Zagreb

Services
- Emergency department: Yes
- Beds: 750+

History
- Founded: 1988

Links
- Website: http://www.kbd.hr
- Lists: Hospitals in Croatia

Clinical Hospital Dubrava (Croatian: Klinička bolnica Dubrava) is a public teaching hospital in Zagreb, Croatia.

== History ==
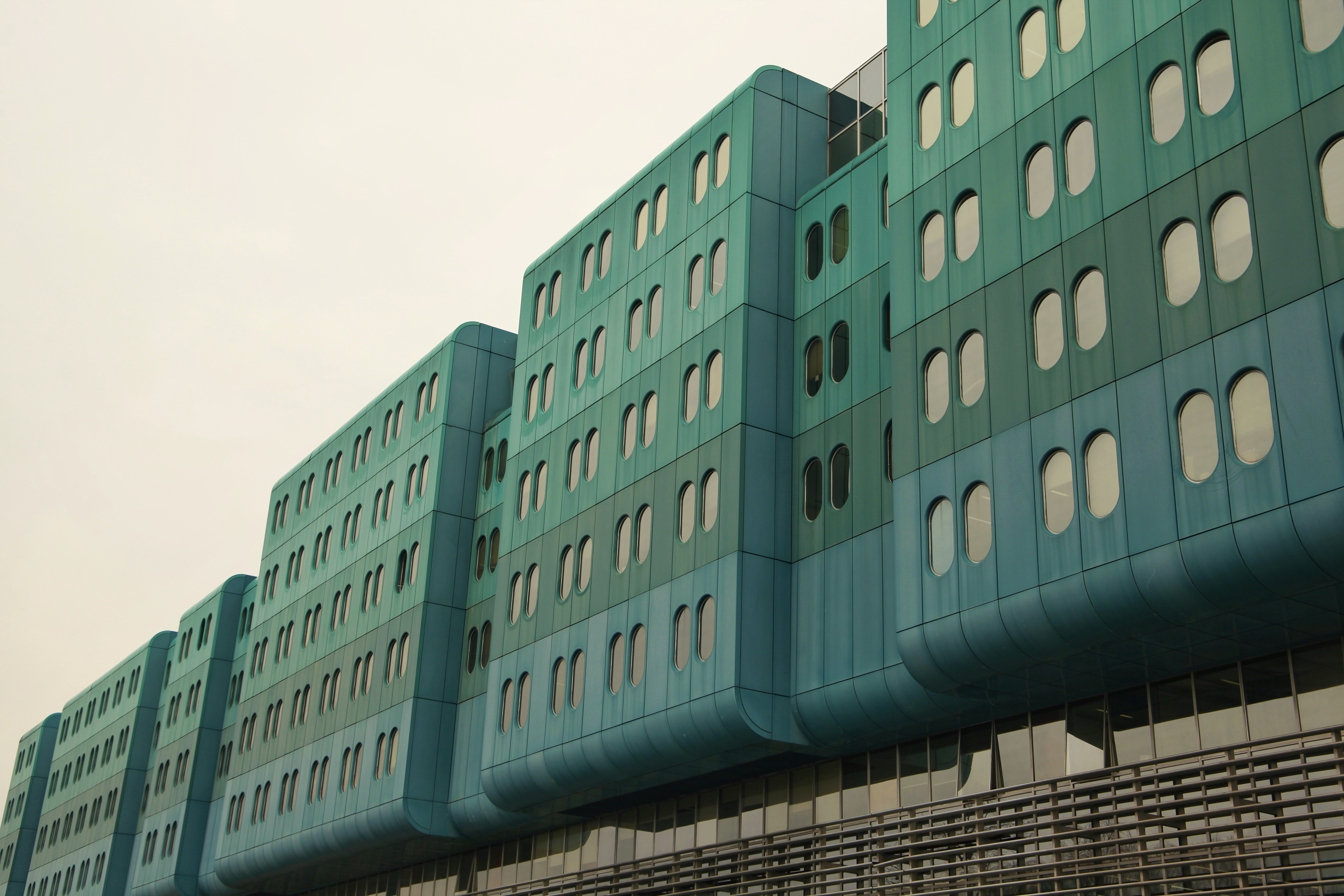
Clinical hospital Dubrava

Clinical Hospital Dubrava was originally planned and built for the needs of the Yugoslav People's Army to be a large military hospital with up to 800 beds. Designed as a Level I trauma and acute care center, Clinical Hospital Dubrava would have been one of the top hospitals for medical care in the region. With the start of hostilities in Croatia at the beginning of 1991, work on the hospital almost came to an abrupt halt, but with assistance from the Croatian health care system, work on the hospital was completed by the end of 1992 when it opened as a public health care medical facility offering 750 beds. Currently, the hospital has 680~ contracted hospital beds. Clinical Hospital Dubrava is a level 1 acute trauma center and referral medical center, one of several in Zagreb (the other being Rebro, and Vinogradska Hospitals).

There are plans to enlarge the current hospital by an additional 300 beds by extending it over what is currently the ground floor labs and research facilities and adding 7 floors. Plans call for a new surgical wing and additional labs and hospital wards.

Currently the hospital is among the best medical facilities in the country, ranked 3rd nationwide by number and scope of treatments and specialists. Currently, the hospital has a total area of 80,470 m^{2} (866,200 sq ft) and serves mainly the eastern Zagreb boroughs, annually performing 18,000 major surgical/medical procedures and 1.4 million other medical treatments for a population of 280,000 residents.

On 2 November 2020, Clinical Hospital Dubrava became a dedicated COVID-19 hospital.
