= Ante Šercer =

Croatian physician

Ante Šercer (21 April 1896, Požega, Kingdom of Croatia-Slavonia – 25 June 1968, Zagreb) was a Yugoslav physician.

He attended elementary school in Dubrovnik. Finishing medical studies in Graz (Austria) and Prague (Czech Republic), he then attended specialized courses in otorhinolaryngology in Zagreb, Vienna, and again in Prague. He started practising at the clinical hospital of the Medical Department (Medicinski fakultet) in Zagreb in 1920, and eventually became its administrator and an associate professor. Later, in 1946, he became head of the department of the othorinolaringology of the Sisters of Charity Hospital (Bolnica Sestara Milosrdnica).

Due to his efforts, and those of Eduard Miloslavić, the Medical Faculty was created in Sarajevo, Bosnia and Herzegovina, in 1944 with eight lecturers. At that time, he also advocated opening the Center for Oriental Studies there. The University of Zagreb provided 15 t of material and other equipment and books needed for 180 students in that first year. Due to that effort, when World War II ended, academician Šercer was sentenced by the newly created government of Yugoslavia to one year of forced labor and the confiscation of the property, found guilty of supporting the NDH.

Šercer published 170 scientific papers, among which outstanding places belong to his works in the field of otolaryngological propaedeutics and clinical treatment, plastic surgery of the nose and ear, oral surgery and tonsilar problems. His method of presenting the infrastructure of the nose through decortication gained world attention. He was among the first in Europe to treat otosclerosis by surgery and worked out a special theory about the etiopathogenesis of this illness. He initiated and was the editor in chief of a Croatian medical Encyclopedia, which was one of the first books of that kind in the world.

Among the famous people he treated were the Jazz musician Louis Armstrong ("Satchmo") and opera stars including Mario del Monaco and Giuseppe di Stefano.

== Bibliography ==
- Šercer, Ante (in Croatian)
