= Božidar Špišić =

Croatian orthopedist (1879–1957)

- Born: 6 September 1879; Sisak, Austria-Hungary
- Died: 31 August 1957 (aged 77); Zagreb, SFR Yugoslavia
- Education: University of Graz
- Scientific career
- Fields: Orthopedics

Božidar Špišić (September 6, 1879 in Sisak - August 31, 1957 in Zagreb) was an orthopedist and rector of the University of Zagreb.

In 1908, Špišić formed the first orthopedic bureau in Croatia, which is seen as the founding of orthopedics in the country. Špišić formed the orthopedic clinic in Zagreb in 1930. He was the rector of the University of Zagreb from 1943 to 1944. In 1946, illness forced him to retire.

The Croatian Academy of Sciences and Arts held a symposium on Špišić in 2005. In 2008, Špišić's native city of Sisak decided to name a street in his honour to mark the 100th anniversary of orthopedics in Croatia.

Academic offices
Preceded by Stjepan Ivšić	Rector of the University of Zagreb; 1943–1944	Succeeded by Stjepan Horvat
