= Boris Labar =

- Born: 1947 (age 78–79); Zadar, PR Croatia, FPR Yugoslavia

Boris Labar (born 1947) is a Croatian physician and scientist in the field of hematology and hematopoietic stem cell transplantation.

== Education and career ==
Labar received a doctor of medicine degree in 1970 from the University of Zagreb School of Medicine. In the period from 1972 until 1976, he underwent specialization in internal medicine. In 1977, he took up the position of Assistant Professor at the Department of Internal Medicine at the University of Zagreb School of Medicine. In 1982 he received his Ph.D. degree from the University of Zagreb School of Medicine after defending the thesis entitled Pyruvate kinase in acute leukemia.

In 1982, Labar with his team established the first bone marrow transplant (or HCT) program in South-Eastern Europe, at a time when such centers were rare even in the most developed countries. From 1985-to 2012 Dr. Labar was the Head of the Division of Hematology. From 2000-2004 he was the Dean of the University of Zagreb School of Medicine. In 2005 he became Full Professor of Medicine at the aforementioned institution. In 2012 Dr. Labar retired from the University of Zagreb Medical Center “Rebro”. He continues to actively practice medicine in the private sector, currently at the Zagreb Clinic Center for Expert Medicine.

His research area is hematology, acute leukemia and lymphoma, with a focus on intensive chemotherapy and stem cell transplantation. Since 1974 Labar has published more than 405 scholarly articles, of which more than 100 appeared in Current Contents (CC) cited journals, with over 2000 citations.

== Personal life ==
Labar lives in Zagreb. He is married and has two sons.
