= School of Dental Medicine, University of Zagreb =

Dental school in Zagreb, Croatia

School of Dental Medicine
- Stomatološki fakultet (SFZG)
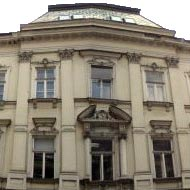
- Type: Public
- Established: 1962
- Affiliations: University of Zagreb
- Dean: Zrinka Tarle
- Students: 938
- Undergraduates: 733
- Postgraduates: 76
- Doctoral students: 129
- Location: Zagreb, Croatia
- Nickname: SFZG
- Website: Official website

The University of Zagreb (Croatian: Stomatološki fakultet:, acronym: SFZG) School of Dental Medicine is a Croatian university for undergraduate and postgraduate education in the field of dental medicine in Croatia. The university was founded in 1922; and the School of Dental Medicine was established in 1962.

== History ==
=== School formation ===
On January 20, 1922, Assistant Professor Eduard Radošević was appointed as the new Chair of Odontology in the School of Medicine. In the school's earlier days, there was little space for lectures and no provision for clinical dental courses. This changed in 1935, when the university formed a dental practice division. The practice division developed during the following year, and became the dental department. Two years later the dental department was further developed into a more formal dental clinic and was run by its founding director, Radošević and two assistants. However, it still remained a part of its parent clinic, Otolaryngology. It was not until 1939 that the dental clinic separated from the department of Otolaryngology and became a separate department; which had Professor Ivo Čupar as the inaugural head.

=== Formation of the Odontology Section ===
In 1948, a separate Odontological Department in the School of Medicine was established; which ran courses for the next five years (until 1953). Three years after the establishment of the Odontological Department, its dental students began attending classes separately from the general medicine students. The first teachers in the Odontological Department were Dr. Živko Bolf and Dr. Miroslav Suvin.

In 1951, the Ministry of Public Health of the People's Republic of Croatia issued the order for the formation of the Odontological Department. In 1954, the first eight students completed the dental degree.

In 1957, the Odontological Section was renamed as the Dentistry Department, and graduate students received the academic title of Doctor of Medicinae Stomatologicae.

Dentistry study received their first Associate Dean in the 1960–61 year, Professor Miroslav Suvin.

=== Formation of the School of Dental Medicine ===
Following these events, the Croatian Parliament made the decision in 1962 to create the independent 'School of Dental Medicine at University of Zagreb'. As part of the same decision, Professor Živko Bolf was appointed as founding dean.

== Sources ==
- As of this edit, this article uses content from "Povijest - Web Stomatološkog fakulteta", which is licensed in a way that permits reuse under the Creative Commons Attribution-ShareAlike 3.0 Unported License, but not under the GFDL. All relevant terms must be followed.
- Jadranka Keros (2012-09-25). "Povijest". Official website (in Croatian). School of Dental Medicine, University of Zagreb.
