= Ministry of Health (Croatia) =

Ministry of the Croatian government

Ministry of Health Ministarstvo zdravstva
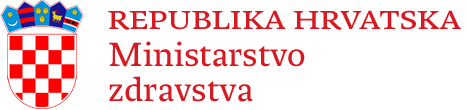

Ministry overview
- Formed: 31 May 1990; 36 years ago
- Type: Ministry in the Government of Croatia
- Jurisdiction: Croatia
- Headquarters: Ksaver 200, Zagreb, Croatia
- Employees: 432 (2025 estimate)
- Budget: €3.12 billion (2025 budget)
- Website: zdravlje.gov.hr

Minister
- Currently: Irena Hrstić since 6 December 2024

The Ministry of Health of the Republic of Croatia (Croatian: Ministarstvo zdravstva) is the ministry in the Government of Croatia which is in charge of health care and welfare.

The current Minister of Health, serving in the Cabinet of Andrej Plenković, is Irena Hrstić.

The longest serving Minister of Health (and the only one to serve multiple terms) was Andrija Hebrang, who held the position for a total of 7 years and 343 days, during the administrations of six Croatian Prime Ministers.

== List of ministers ==
| Minister | Party | Term start | Term end | Days in office |
|---|---|---|---|---|
| Andrija Hebrang | HDZ | 30 May 1990 | 12 August 1992 | 805 |
| Juraj Njavro | HDZ | 12 August 1992 | 12 October 1993 | 426 |
| Andrija Hebrang (2nd term) | HDZ | 12 October 1993 | 14 May 1998 | 1,675 |
| Željko Reiner | HDZ | 14 May 1998 | 27 January 2000 | 623 |
| Ana Stavljenić Rukavina | HSS | 27 January 2000 | 23 October 2001 | 635 |
| Andro Vlahušić | HNS | 22 November 2001 | 23 December 2003 | 761 |
| Andrija Hebrang^{[nb 1]} (3rd term) | HDZ | 23 December 2003 | 15 February 2005 | 420 |
| Neven Ljubičić^{[nb 1]} | HDZ | 15 February 2005 | 12 January 2008 | 1,061 |
| Darko Milinović^{[nb 1]} | HDZ | 12 January 2008 | 23 December 2011 | 1,441 |
| Rajko Ostojić | SDP | 23 December 2011 | 11 June 2014 | 901 |
| Siniša Varga | SDP | 11 June 2014 | 22 January 2016 | 590 |
| Dario Nakić | HDZ | 22 January 2016 | 19 October 2016 | 271 |
| Milan Kujundžić | HDZ | 19 October 2016 | 28 January 2020 | 1,196 |
| Vili Beroš | HDZ | 31 January 2020 | 15 November 2024 | 1,750 |
| Irena Hrstić | HDZ | 6 December 2024 | Incumbent | 606 |

=== Notes ===
nb 1. Served as Minister of Health and Social Welfare
