= University Hospital Centre Zagreb =

Coordinates: 45°49′26″N 16°00′23″E

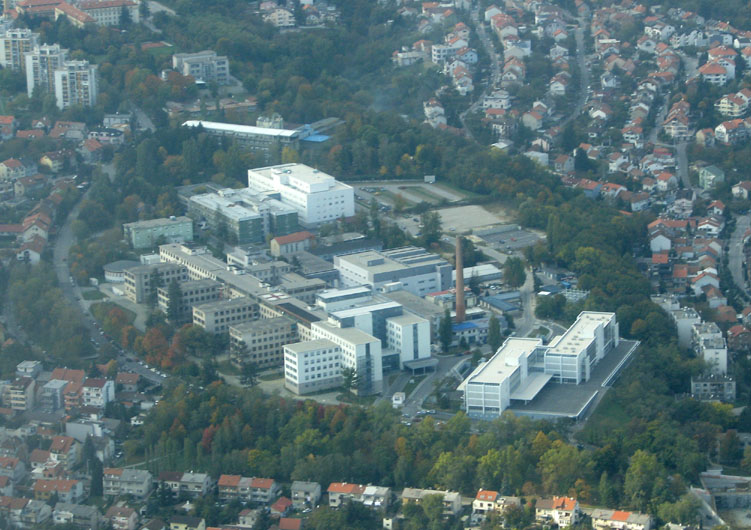
- University Hospital Centre Zagreb - Rebro campus

Geography
- Location: Šalata 2, Zagreb, Croatia

Organisation
- Care system: Publicly funded health care
- Type: Clinical
- Affiliated university: University of Zagreb

Services
- Emergency department: Yes
- Beds: 1800

History
- Opened: 1942

Links
- Website: www.kbc-zagreb.hr
- Lists: Hospitals in Croatia

The University Hospital Centre (sometimes also Clinical Hospital Centre, Croatian: Klinički bolnički centar Zagreb, KBC) in Zagreb, Croatia, is the largest hospital in Croatia and the teaching hospital of the University of Zagreb. It serves most of Central and Northern Croatia for specialist and acute medical procedures. The average waiting time for outpatient treatment is approximately 5 months and it should be booked in advance either by mail, email or telefax.

The main hospital campus is located in Kišpatićeva street in Maksimir, and is colloquially known as "Rebro". Another major campus is located at Šalata, in immediate vicinity to the School of Medicine, University of Zagreb. Currently the hospital center also operates three other locations - the obstetrics facility at Petrova street, the rehabilitation facility at Božidarevićeva street and the dental department at Gundulićeva street.

The University Hospital Centre Zagreb is a publicly funded teaching hospital providing general and advanced medical care. With over ~1800 beds and 5470 employees, it is the largest and most advanced medical facility in Croatia.

The hospital offers gamma knife treatment as well as a Proton Beam Therapy treatment centre which makes the hospital among rare such facilities in Europe.

== History ==
The hospital was established in 1942 as the University Hospital Zagreb, when the main site (Rebro) was first built. Other individual hospital locations existed from earlier periods - the first Clinical Hospitals of the University of Zagreb Faculty of Medicine were founded in the 1920s. The current central campus covers 152,000 m^{2} (1,640,000 sq ft) and there are plans are to centralize other facilities spread across the city to the central location of Rebro. The main campus has about 1720 beds, with another 210 beds at Petrova Maternity Hospital and another 180 beds at facility on Šalata. As it stands, the University Hospital Zagreb is the largest hospital in Croatia offering a total of 2110 beds. A total of 7540 staff work at the hospital, 4570 of whom are medical professionals and 945 of which medical doctors and specialists that work at the facility.

The hospital underwent major expansion in the early 2000s, when 36 additional operating theatres were added along with a number of other specialist clinics. Currently, the hospital consists of 30 clinics and 7 specialized institutions. Since July 2010, the Clinical Hospital, "Jordanovac,” a respiratory disease clinic located near Rebro has been part of the University Hospital Centre.

Hospital expansion plans consist of the construction of new facilities in the near future, such as a large multi story garage for up to 650 cars and the first of 2 Emergency Heliports and a brand new ~28,000 m^{2} (300,000 sq ft) Orthopaedic Clinic. Clinics that are currently spread across the city will move to this new central campus, this includes the Orthopaedic Clinic currently located at Šalata Campus. Once the current expansion plans are completed, the central campus will expand to 184,000 m^{2} (1,980,000 sq ft) of hospital facilities and an additional 42,000 m^{2} (450,000 sq ft) of supporting facilities, such as multi story garages and generator rooms, to name a few. The number of beds will drop to around 1720 beds as comfort for patients will improve and most hospital rooms will now feature a maximum of 3 patient beds per hospital room as well as sanitary facilities for each room. The goal is the improvement of hospital care and maintaining EU standards in healthcare provisions.

A brand new 100,000 m^{2} (1,100,000 sq ft), 540 bed General Hospital in Blato will instead act as a spillway for the University Hospital and this will alleviate pressure from the current University Hospital and provide another large hospital in Zagreb.
