= Faculty of Medicine, University of Zagreb =

Medical school in Zagreb, Croatia

Coordinates: 45°49′07″N 15°59′05″E

- Medicinski fakultet
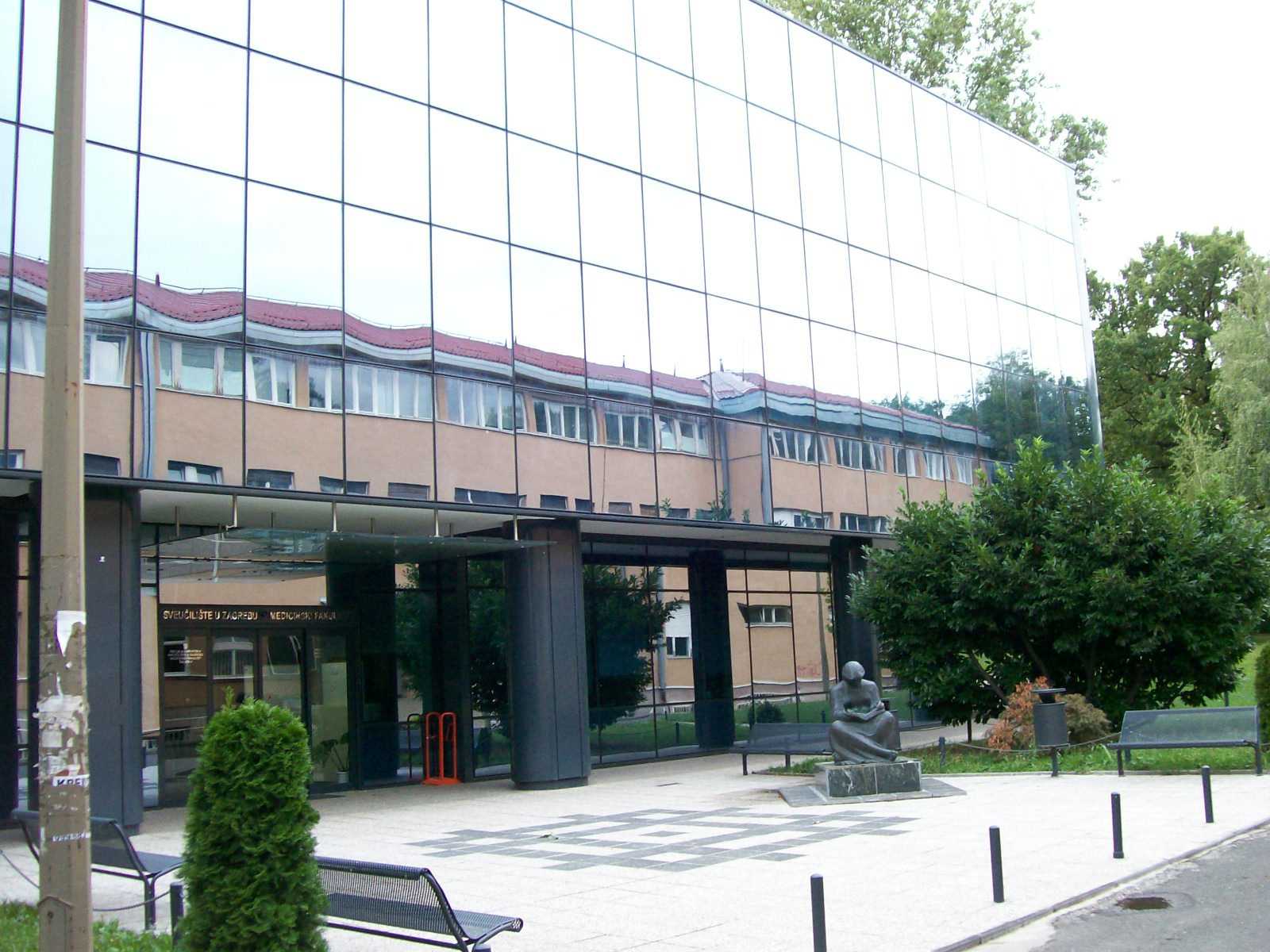
- Type: Public
- Established: 13 November 1917
- Affiliations: University of Zagreb
- Rector: Stjepan Lakušić
- Dean: Prof. dr. sc. Slavko Orešković
- Location: Zagreb, Croatia
- Website: mef.hr

The Faculty of Medicine, University of Zagreb (Croatian: Medicinski fakultet u Zagrebu or MEF) is the medical school of the University of Zagreb, located in Zagreb, Croatia. It is the oldest and biggest of the four medical schools in Croatia (the other three being in Osijek, Rijeka and Split). It was established in 1917.

== History ==
The School of Medicine in Zagreb was originally envisioned as one of the four founding members of the modern University of Zagreb in the Croatian Parliament's piece of legislation passed on 13 January 1874, at the time when Kingdom of Croatia-Slavonia was a constituent part of Austria-Hungary.

The university was officially inaugurated by Ivan Mažuranić on 19 October 1874. The Faculty of Catholic Theology and the Faculty of Law had already been operating and the Faculty of Philosophy was launched that year with the first generation of students. However, the School of Medicine's official launch was postponed due to lack of funding. This situation prolonged and the school had to wait for more than 40 years to open its doors to students.

On 13 November 1917 the Croatian Parliament passed a decree, approved by the Viennese Court Chancellory (Hofkanzlei), which stipulated that the School of Medicine is to be established, and that three professors are to be appointed to organise the school and hire the required teaching staff. Thus, the school's first professors became Theodor Wickerhauser, Miroslav Čačković and Dragutin Mašek. On 17 December 1917 the first professors' conference was held, and this date is officially celebrated as the school's day. The very first lecture was held on 12 January 1918, delivered by professor Drago Perović.

In the following years, the school significantly expanded its teaching staff, and a number of specialised clinics affiliated with the school were established, such as the clinics for internal medicine (1920), obstetrics and gynaecology (1920), neuropsychiatry (1921), otolaryngology (1921), pediatrics (1922), dermatology and venereal diseases (1922), orthopedics (1922), stomatology (1922), and an institute for radiology and occupational therapy (1922).

In the early 1980s, the school moved into their new central building in the Šalata neighborhood in northern Zagreb. The building was officially opened on 25 May 1981, when Frano Kršinić's sculpture Girl Holding a Book (Djevojka s knjigom) was unveiled.

The Institute of Forensic Medicine and Criminalistics (Zavod za sudsku medicinu i kriminalistiku), with its DNA analysis laboratory, is conducting identifications of the remains of victims from the Croatian War of Independence; 95% of all victims from the War until 2026 have been identified in this laboratory.

== Deans ==
- 1917–1919 – Miroslav Čačković
- 1919–1920 – Boris Zarnik
- 1920–1921 – Fran Smetanka
- 1921–1922 – Fran Bubanović
- 1922–1923 – Emil Prašek
- 1923–1924 – Dragutin Mašek
- 1924–1925 – Miroslav Čačković
- 1925–1926 – Fran Smetanka
- 1926–1927 – Karlo Radoničić
- 1927–1928 – Julije Budisavljević
- 1928–1929 – Albert Botteri
- 1929–1930 – Franjo Durst
- 1930–1931 – Fran Bubanović
- 1931–1932 – Karlo Radoničić
- 1932–1933 – Sergije Saltykow
- 1933–1934 – Franjo Kogoj
- 1934–1935 – Ernest Mayerhofer
- 1935–1936 – Laza Popović
- 1936–1937 – Ante Šercer
- 1937–1938 – Božidar Špišić
- 1938–1939 – Fran Smetanka
- 1939–1940 – Ivan Botteri
- 1940–1941 – Andrija Štampar
- 1941–1943 – Božidar Špišić
- 1943–1945 – Ante Šercer
- 1945–1947 – Branimir Gušić
- 1947–1948 – Radoslav Lopašić
- 1948–1949 – Franjo Kogoj
- 1949–1950 – Ivan Čupar
- 1950–1951 – Stjepan Vidaković
- 1951–1952 – Franjo Kogoj
- 1952–1957 – Andrija Štampar
- 1957–1958 – Fran Mihaljević
- 1958–1960 – Branimir Gušić
- 1960–1963 – Arpad Hahn
- 1963–1966 – Josip Fališevac
- 1966–1970 – Sergije Dogan
- 1970–1975 – Anton Zimolo
- 1975–1978 – Zvonimir Krajina
- 1978–1982 – Mladen Sekso
- 1982–1985 – Ljubomir Čečuk
- 1985–1989 – Nijaz Hadžić
- 1989–1990 – Želimir Jakšić
- 1990–1992 – Mate Granić
- 1992–1994 – Ivica Kostović
- 1994–1997 – Niko Zurak
- 1997–2000 – Zvonko Kusić
- 2000–2004 – Boris Labar
- 2004–2009 – Nada Čikeš
- 2009–2015 – Davor Miličić
- 2015–2021 – Marijan Klarica
- 2021- – Slavko Orešković

== See also ==
- University of Zagreb
- School of Medicine, University of Split
