= Split, Croatia =

City in Croatia

Split
- City
- Grad Split; City of Split
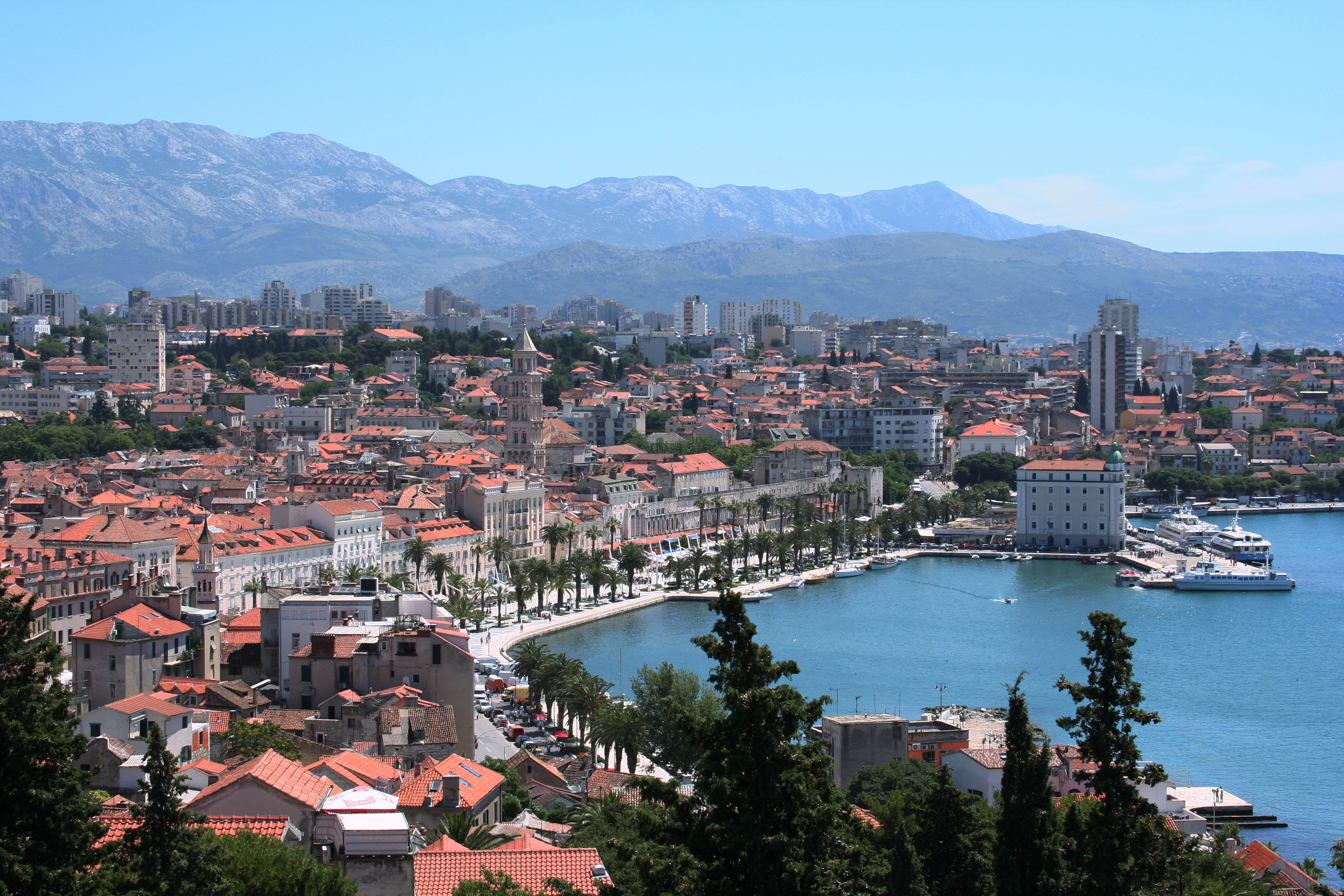
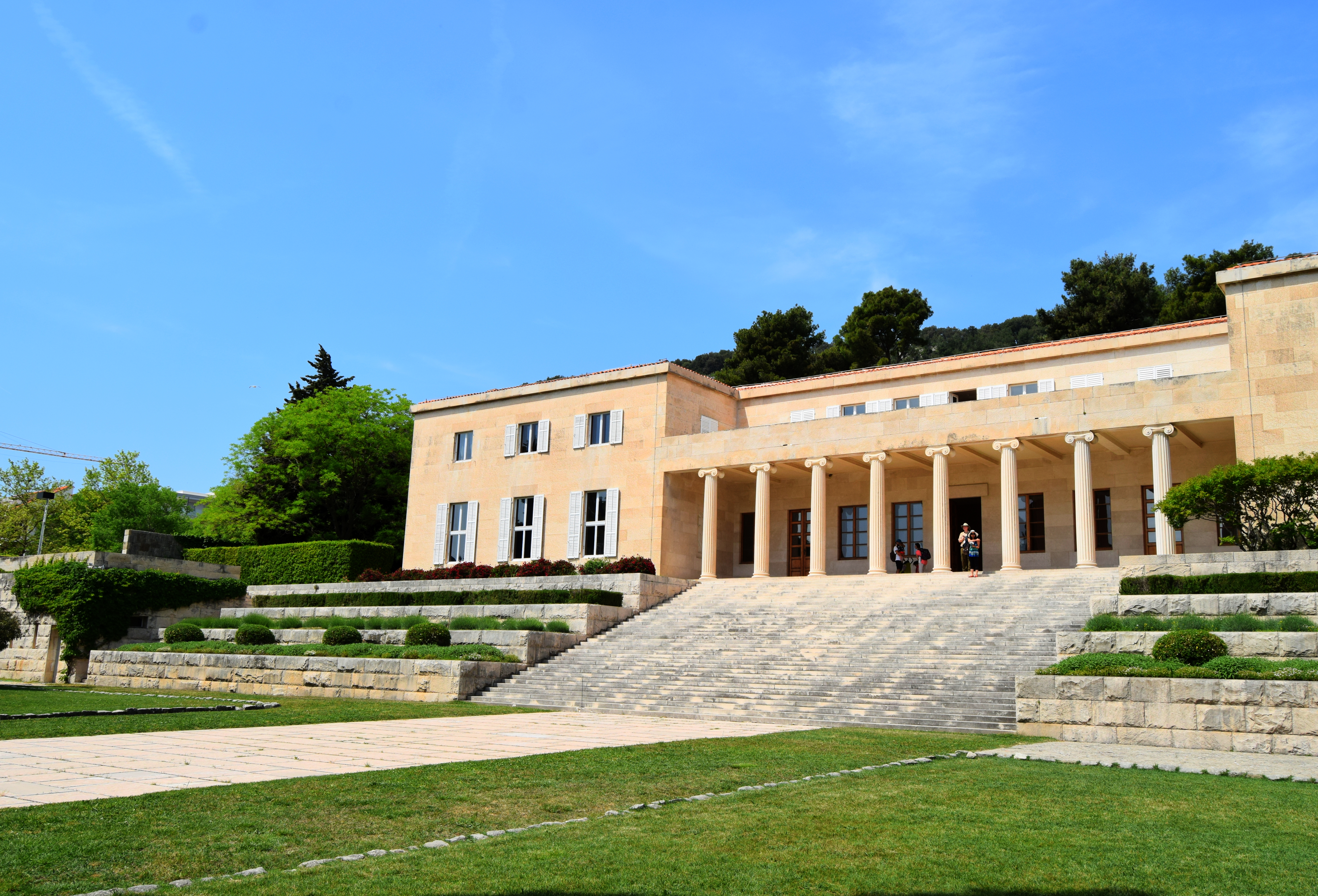
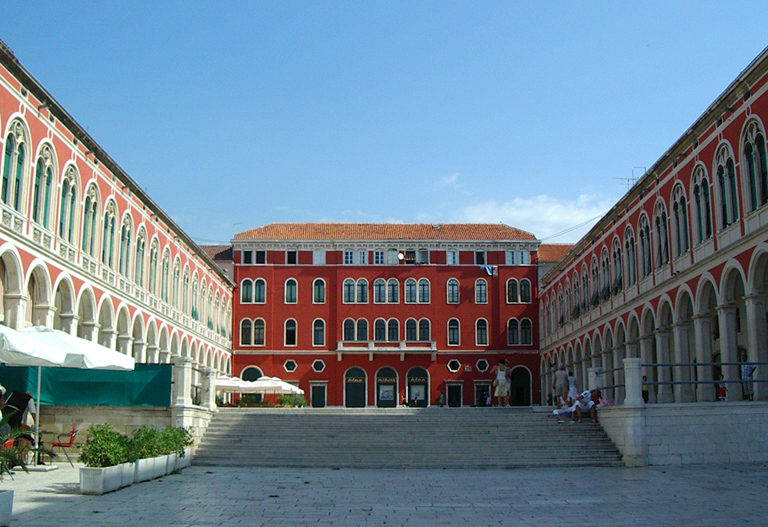
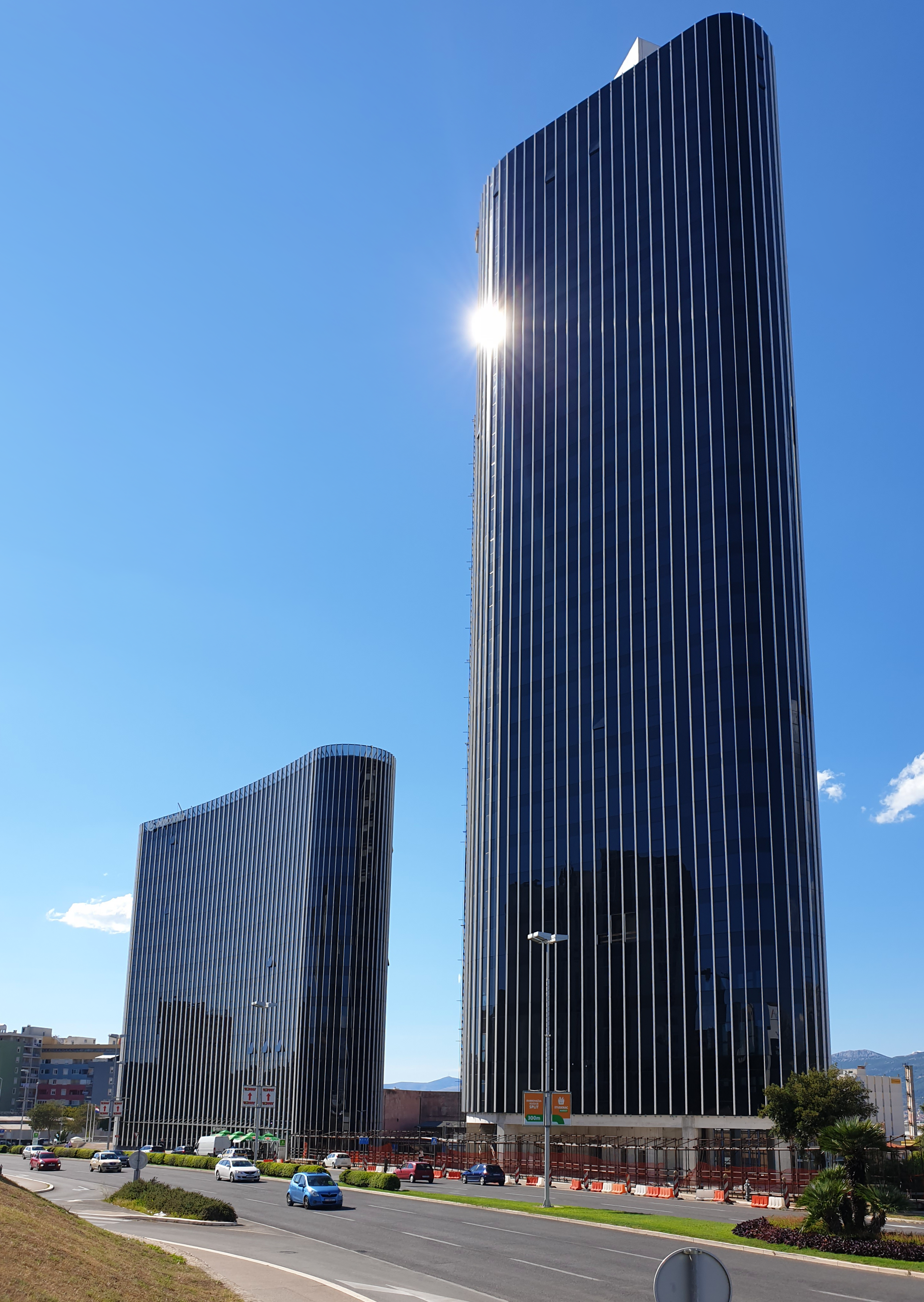
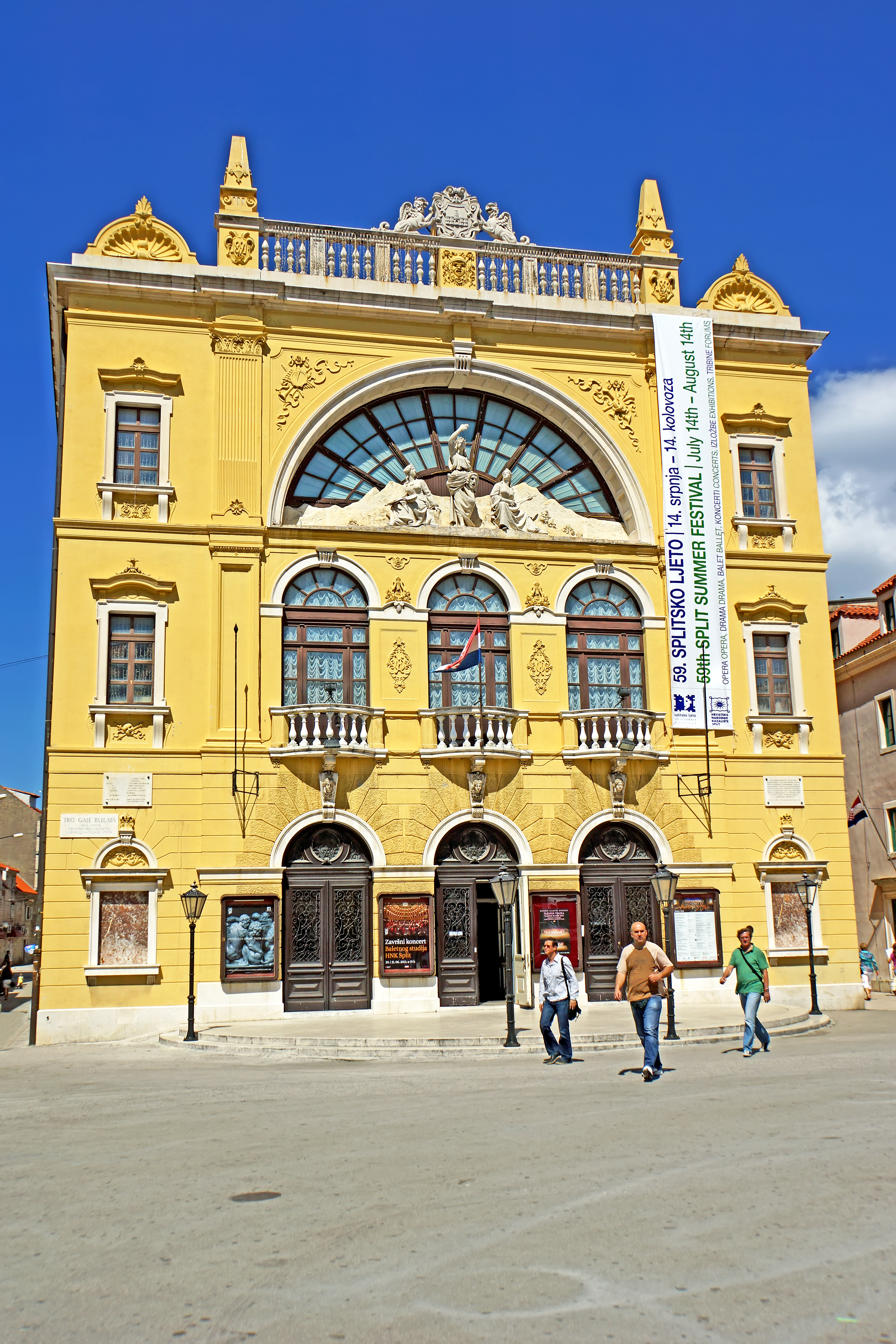
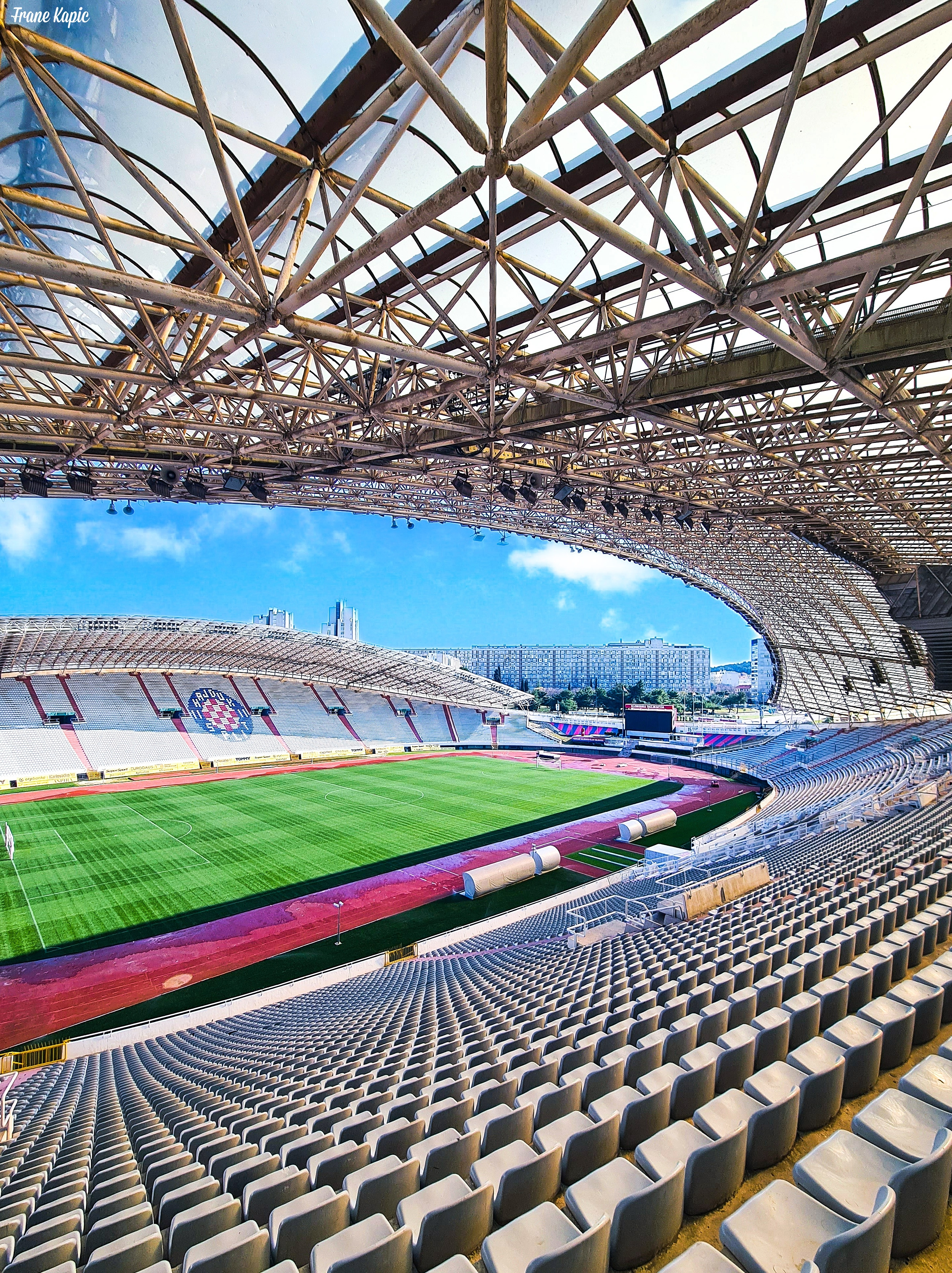
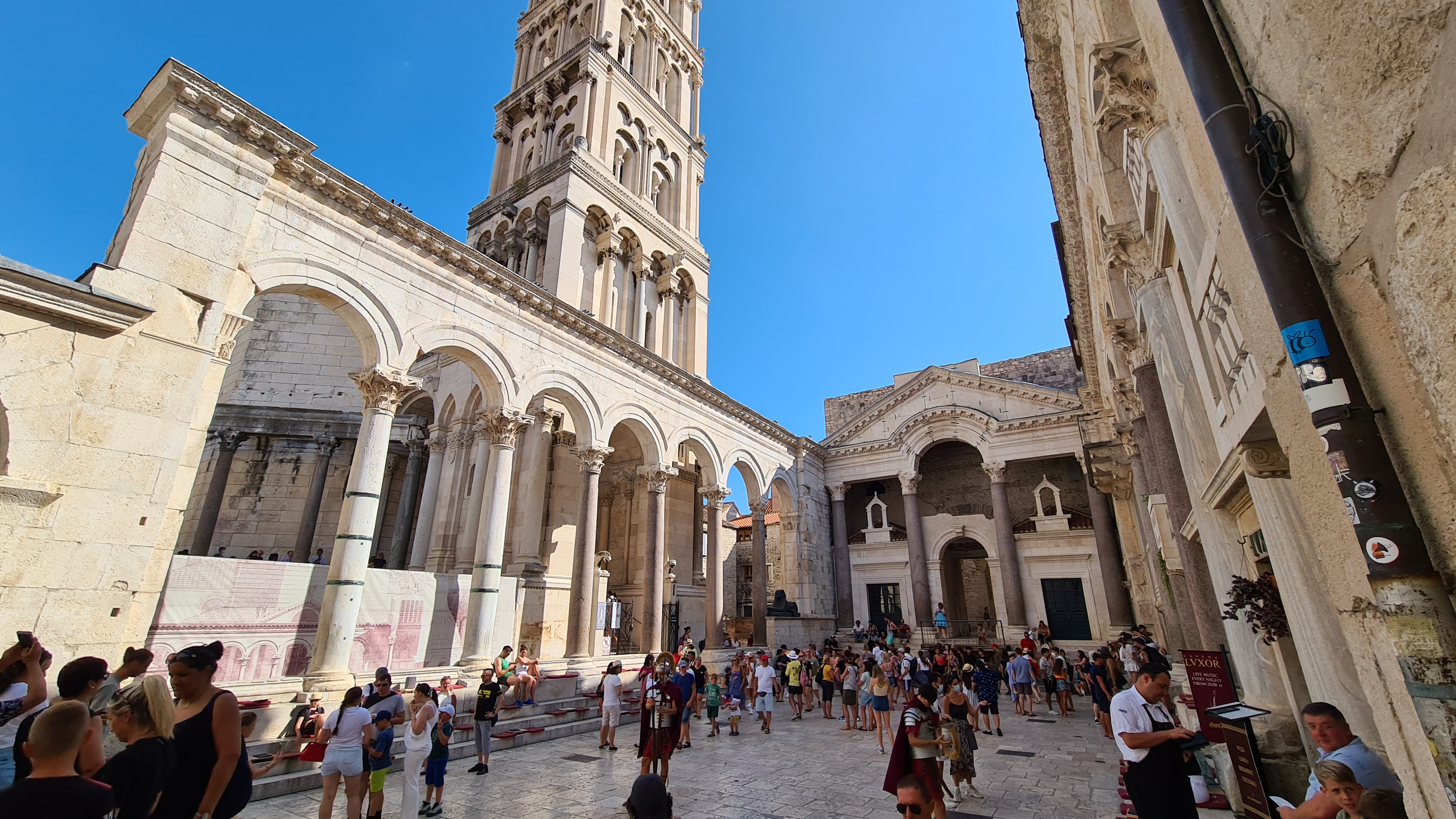
- View of Split promenade from Marjan hill Meštrović Gallery Prokurative Dalmatia Tower Split Theatre Poljud Stadium Historical Complex of Diocletian's Palace with Saint Domnius Cathedral

- Flag Coat of arms
- Nickname: Velo Misto ('The Big Place')
- Anthem: "Marjane, Marjane"
- Interactive map of Split
- Location in Croatia Location in Europe
- Coordinates: 43°30′36″N 16°26′24″E
- Country: Croatia
- Region: Dalmatia
- County: Split-Dalmatia County
- Founded as Aspálathos: 3rd or 2nd century BCE
- Diocletian's Palace built: 305 CE
- Diocletian's Palace settled: 639 CE

Government
  - Type: Mayor-Council
  - Mayor: Tomislav Šuta (HDZ)
  - City Council: 31 members: Centre (11); HDZ, DP, HSLS (10); HGS (4); SDP, M!, Direkt (3); Most, DOMiNO (2); Independent (1)
  - Electoral district: 10th

Area
  - City: 79.4 km^{2} (30.7 sq mi)
  - Urban: 23.1 km^{2} (8.9 sq mi)
  - Metro: 1,286.9 km^{2} (496.9 sq mi)
- Elevation: 0 m (0 ft)

Population (2021)
  - City: 160,577
  - Density: 2,020/km^{2} (5,240/sq mi)
  - Urban: 149,830
  - Urban density: 6,490/km^{2} (16,800/sq mi)
  - Metro: 307,289
  - Metro density: 238.78/km^{2} (618.44/sq mi)
- Time zone: UTC+1 (CET)
  - Summer (DST): UTC+2 (CEST)
- Postal code: HR-21 000
- Area code: +385 21
- Vehicle registration: ST
- Patron saint: Saint Domnius
- Website: split.hr

UNESCO World Heritage Site
- Official name: Historical Complex of Split with the Palace of Diocletian
- Criteria: Cultural: (ii)(iii)(iv)
- Reference: 97
- Inscription: 1979 (3rd Session)
- Area: 20.8 ha (51 acres)

Split (/splɪt/; Croatian: [splît]) is the second-largest city in Croatia, after the capital Zagreb, situated on the eastern shore of the Adriatic Sea. As the administrative seat of Split-Dalmatia County and the largest city on the Croatian coast, it serves as a key economic, cultural, and transportation hub for the region. Developed around the historic core of Diocletian's Palace and extending across a central peninsula toward its surrounding suburbs and hinterland, Split combines a continuous urban tradition spanning more than seventeen centuries with a contemporary role as one of Croatia's leading tourist destinations. The city itself has a population of over 160,000, while the metropolitan area encompasses approximately 310,000 inhabitants.

The city was founded as the Greek colony of Aspálathos (Ancient Greek: Ἀσπάλαθος) in the 3rd or 2nd century BCE on the coast of the Illyrian Dalmatae, and in 305 CE, it became the site of the Palace of the Roman emperor Diocletian. It became a prominent settlement around 650 when it succeeded the ancient capital of the Roman province of Dalmatia, Salona. After the sack of Salona by the Avars and Slavs, the fortified Palace of Diocletian was settled by Roman refugees. Soon after, Split became a Byzantine city. Later it drifted into the sphere of the Republic of Venice and the Kingdom of Croatia. For much of the High and Late Middle Ages, Split enjoyed autonomy as a free city of the Dalmatian city-states, caught in the middle of a struggle between Venice and Croatia for control over the Dalmatian cities.

Venice eventually prevailed and, during the early modern period, Split remained a Venetian city, a heavily fortified outpost surrounded by Ottoman territory. Its hinterland was won from the Ottomans in the Morean War of 1699, and in 1797, as Venice fell to Napoleon, the Treaty of Campo Formio rendered the city to the Habsburg monarchy. In 1805, the Peace of Pressburg added it to the Napoleonic Kingdom of Italy and in 1806 it was included in the French Empire, becoming part of the Illyrian Provinces in 1809. After being occupied in 1813, it was eventually granted to the Austrian Empire following the Congress of Vienna, where the city remained a part of the Austrian Kingdom of Dalmatia until the dissolution of Austria-Hungary in 1918 and the creation of Yugoslavia. In World War II, the city was annexed by Italy, then liberated by the Partisans after the Italian capitulation in 1943. It was then re-occupied by Germany, which granted it to its puppet Independent State of Croatia (NDH). The city was liberated again by the Partisans in 1944, and was included in the post-war Socialist Yugoslavia, as part of the People's Republic of Croatia. In 1991, Croatia seceded from Yugoslavia amid the Croatian War of Independence.

Today, Split is a major transportation hub and a popular tourist destination attracting over one million visitors annually. Its historic core, a UNESCO World Heritage Site since 1979, reflects the city's continuous urban life from late antiquity to the present. The Port of Split is one of the busiest passenger ports in the Mediterranean and serves as a key gateway to the southern Adriatic islands, while the University of Split reinforces the city's role as a major educational and research centre. The city gained additional international recognition when it hosted the 1979 Mediterranean Games and 1990 European Athletics Championships.

== Name ==
The name Aspálathos or Spálathos may come from the spiny broom (Calicotome spinosa, ἀσπάλαθος in Greek), although it is the related Spanish broom (Spartium junceum, σπάρτος) that is common in the area.

After the Roman conquest, the name became Spalatum or Aspalatum in Latin, which in the Middle Ages evolved into Aspalathum, Spalathum, Spalatrum and Spalatro in the Dalmatian language of the city's Romance population. The Venetian name, Spalato, became official under Venetian era, in international usage by the Early Modern Period and is still the name of the city in Italian. From the 10th century onwards, the local use was Spaleto, from where, through a stage *Spəlētu- to *Splětъ, came the South Slavic forms: the ekavian Splet, ijekavian Spljet and ikavian Split. In the 19th century, following the Illyrian movement and its official recognition by the Habsburg Monarchy, the Croatian names Split and Spljet became increasingly prominent, before Split officially replaced Spljet in 1910, by decision of the city council.

Formerly, the name was thought to be related to Latin palatium 'palace', a reference to Diocletian's Palace. Various theories were developed, such as the notion that the name derives from S. Palatium, an abbreviation of Salonae Palatium. The erroneous "palace" etymologies were notably due to Byzantine Emperor Constantine VII Porphyrogenitus, and were later mentioned by Thomas the Archdeacon. The city is several centuries older than the palace.

== History ==
=== Antiquity ===
Although the beginnings of Split are traditionally associated with the construction of Diocletian's Palace in 305, the city was founded several centuries earlier as the Greek colony of Aspálathos, or Spálathos. It was a colony of the polis of Issa, the modern-day town of Vis, itself a colony of the Sicilian city of Syracuse. The exact year the city was founded is not known, but it is estimated to have been in the 3rd or 2nd century BC. The Greek settlement lived off trade with the surrounding Illyrian tribes, mostly the Delmatae.

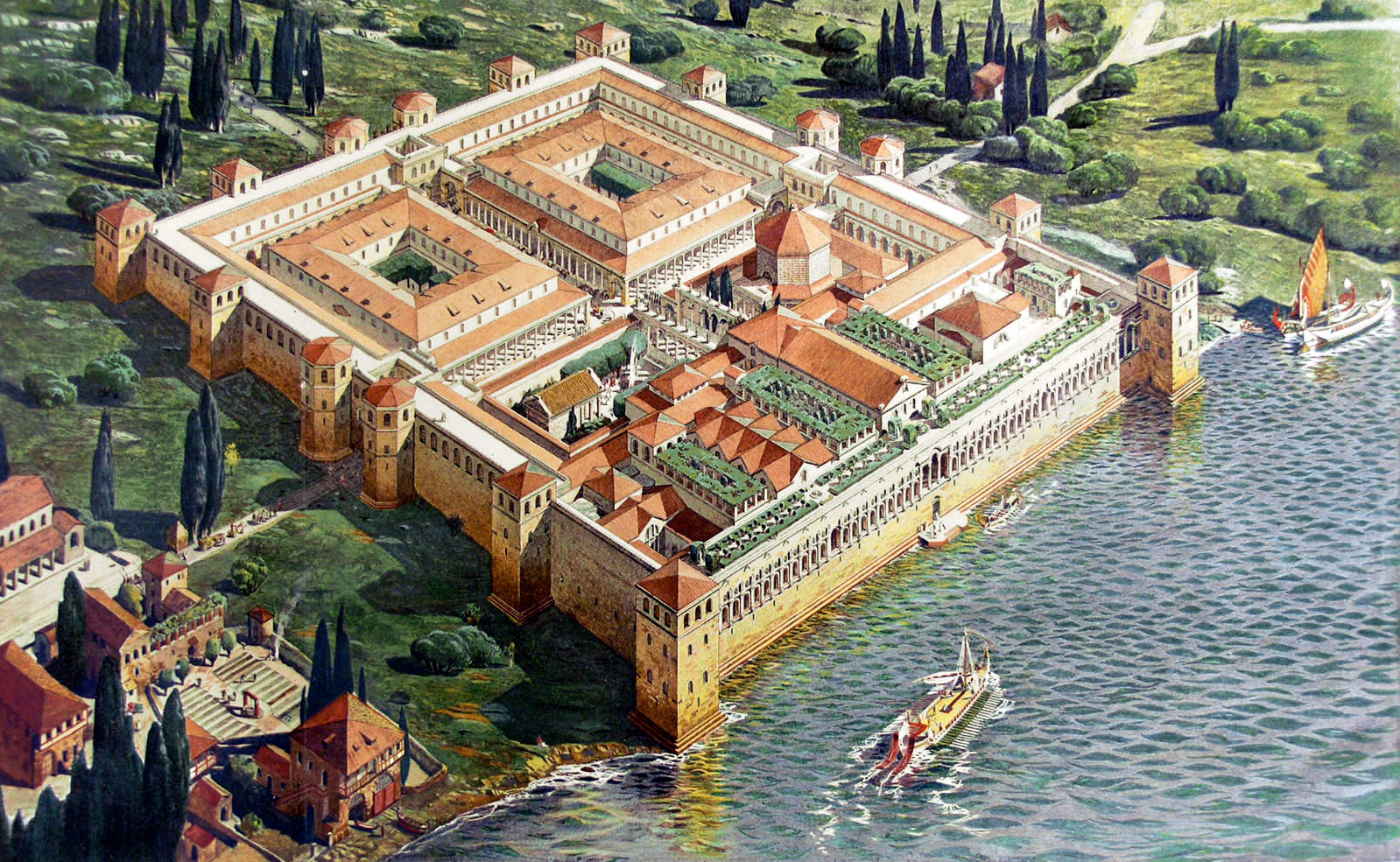
Reconstruction of the Palace of the Roman Emperor Diocletian in its original appearance upon completion in 305, by Ernest Hébrard

After the Illyrian Wars of 229 and 219 BC, the city of Salona, only a short distance from Spálathos, became the capital of the Roman Province of Dalmatia and one of the largest cities of the late empire with 60,000 people. The history of Spálathos becomes obscure for a while at this point, being overshadowed by that of nearby Salona, to which it would later become successor. The Roman Emperor Diocletian (ruled AD 284–305) in 293 began the construction of an opulent and heavily fortified palace fronting the sea, near his home town of Salona, selecting the site of Spálathos (or Spalatum in Latin). The Palace was built as a massive structure, much like a Roman military fortress. The palace and the city of Spalatum which formed its surroundings were at times inhabited by a population as large as 8,000 to 10,000 people.

Between 475 and 480, the Palace hosted Flavius Julius Nepos, the last recognised Emperor of the Western Roman Empire. Salona was lost to the Ostrogothic Kingdom in 493, along with most of Dalmatia, but the Emperor Justinian I regained Dalmatia in 535–536.

=== Middle Ages ===
The Pannonian Avars sacked and destroyed Salona in 639; the surviving Romans fled to the nearby islands. The Dalmatian region and its shores were at this time settled by tribes of Croats, a South Slavic people subservient to the Avar khagans. The Salonitans regained the land under Severus the Great in 650 and settled the 300-year-old Palace of Diocletian, which could not be effectively besieged by the Slavic tribes of the mainland. The Emperor Constans II granted them an Imperial mandate to establish themselves in the Palace as the City of Spalatum, which imposed upon the Croatian Slavs – at the time allies of Byzantium against the Avars – a cessation of hostilities. The Temple of Jupiter was rededicated to the Virgin Mary and the remains of the popular Saint Domnius were recovered from the ruins of Salona, later establishing the Cathedral of Saint Domnius as new seat of the Archbishop of Salona.

Until the Sack of Constantinople, Split remained a de jure possession of the Byzantine Empire as a Byzantine duchy, administered by the Exarchate of Ravenna and after 751 by Jadera (Zadar). Its hinterland was now home to the Duchy of the Croats. In this period, an independent Dalmatian language developed from Latin, with a distinct local dialect: to its inhabitants, the city became known as Spalatrum or Spalatro, one of the main Dalmatian city-states.

In 925, Tomislav's Kingdom of Croatia emerged in the hinterland of the city, centered in Nin as an ally of Byzantium against Simeon I of Bulgaria – though without receiving any power from the Emperor over the Dalmatian cities. The rise of the rival Bishopric of Nin, headed by Bishop Gregory, which attempted to institute the "Slavonic" or "Slavic language" as the language of religious service, led to the 925 Synod of Split, at which it was decreed that "no one should presume to celebrate the divine mysteries in the Slavonic language, but only in Latin and Greek, and that no one of that tongue should be advanced to the holy orders".

Historical affiliations

- Illyria (9th–3rd centuries BCE)
- Aspálathos (3rd century BCE – 219 BCE)
- Roman Republic (219–27 BCE)
- Roman Empire (27 BCE – 476)
- Odoacer's Kingdom of Italy (476–493)
- Ostrogothic Kingdom (493–535)
- Byzantine Empire (535–791)
- Francia (791–812)
- Byzantine Empire (812–998)
- Republic of Venice (998–1019)
- Byzantine Empire (1019–1069)

Kingdom of Croatia and Dalmatia ( Commune of Spalato) (1069–1091)

- Byzantine Empire ( Theme of Dalmatia) (1091–1096)
- Republic of Venice (1096–1105)
- Kingdom of Croatia and Dalmatia (1105–1116)
- Republic of Venice (1116–1117)
- Kingdom of Croatia and Dalmatia (1117–1118)
- Republic of Venice (1118–1124)
- Kingdom of Croatia and Dalmatia (1124–1125)
- Republic of Venice (1125–1141)
- Kingdom of Croatia and Dalmatia (1141–1171)
- Byzantine Empire (1171–1180)
- Kingdom of Croatia and Dalmatia (1180–1244)
- Kingdom of Croatia and Dalmatia ( Counts of Bribir) (1244–1327)
- Republic of Venice (1327–1357)
- Kingdom of Croatia and Dalmatia (1357–1390)
- Kingdom of Bosnia (1390–1391)
- Kingdom of Croatia and Dalmatia (1391–1403)
- Ladislaus of Naples ( Hrvoje Vukčić Hrvatinić) (1403–1409)
- Ladislaus of Naples (1409–1420)
- Republic of Venice (1420–1797)
- Holy Roman Empire (1797–1805)
- First French Empire ( Napoleonic Kingdom of Italy) (1805–1806)
- First French Empire (1806–1809)
- First French Empire ( Illyrian Provinces) (1809–1813)
- Austrian Empire (1813–1815)
- Austrian Empire ( Kingdom of Dalmatia) (1815–1867)
- Austria-Hungary ( Kingdom of Dalmatia) (1867–1918)
- Kingdom of Yugoslavia (1918–1941)
- Kingdom of Italy ( Governorate of Dalmatia) (1941–1943)
- Greater German Reich ( Independent State of Croatia) (1943–1944)
- SFR Yugoslavia (SR Croatia) (1944–1991)
- Croatia (1991–present)

In 1100, the bell tower which became the main symbol of the city was constructed and dedicated to Saint Domnius, by then regarded as the patron saint of the city.

Throughout the 9th and 10th centuries, Split was raided by the Narentines (a South Slavic confederation recognizing the King of Croatia as their sovereign). Therefore, the city offered its allegiance to Venice and in 998 the Venetian Doge Pietro II Orseolo, led a large naval expedition which defeated the Narentines the same year. After obtaining permission from Emperor Basil II in Constantinople, Orseolo proclaimed himself Duke of Dalmatia. In 1019, the Byzantine Empire restored direct control over Dalmatia. The title "Duke of Dalmatia" seems to have been dropped at this point by the Venetian doges. In 1069, Peter Krešimir IV, King of Croatia, gained control over Dalmatian islands and cities, including Split, and stretched his rule south to Neretva. The coastal cities retained autonomous administration and were still nominally under Byzantine Empire, but were now subjects of the Croatian king.

After the death of Croatian King Stephen II in 1091, a period of succession crisis followed in Croatia, with King Ladislaus I of Hungary interfering in it. Byzantine Emperor Alexios I Komnenos took advantage of this and joined the old Theme of Dalmatia to the Empire. In 1096 Emperor Alexios I Komnenos, at the time engaged in the First Crusade, granted the administration of Dalmatia to the Doge of Venice.

In 1105, Coloman, King of Hungary, after entering personal union with Kingdom of Croatia and Dalmatia, reneged on its alliance with Venice and moved on the coastal towns, besieging and taking Zadar. Split and Trogir decided then to surrender upon guarantee of their ancient privileges. The rights granted to the city (and reaffirmed by new charters) were substantial. Split was to pay no tribute, it was to choose its own count and archbishop whom the king would confirm, it preserved its old Roman laws, and appointed its own judge. Dues from trade (which were substantial in the period), were divided between the count, the archbishop, and the king, and no foreigner was to live within the walls of the city against the will of the citizens. These rights were generally upheld by Hungarian kings, but there were inevitable incidents of violation.

After Coloman's death in 1116, the Doge Ordelafo Faliero returned from Outremer and retook all the Dalmatian cities, and also, for the first time, the Croatian cities of coast such as Biograd and Šibenik. In 1117, he was defeated and killed in renewed battle with the Hungarians under Stephen II of Hungary, and Split again acknowledged Stephen's rule. The new Doge, Domenico Michiel, quickly defeated the Croats and Hungarians again and restored Venetian authority by 1118. In 1124, while the Doge was engaged against the Byzantine Empire, now hostile to Venice, Stephen II recovered Split and Trogir without resistance. Upon Michele's return in 1127, the Doge yet again expelled the Croats and Hungarians from the two cities and utterly destroyed Biograd, the favored seat of the Croatian Kings that the Hungarians were attempting to establish as a rival to the Venetian Zadar.

The cities remained in Venetian hands without contest during the reign of Béla II but in 1141, his successor, King Géza II, having conquered Bosnian lands, marched to Split and Trogir, both voluntarily accepting him as overlord. This turned out to be a definitive conquest, as Venetian rule was not to return to Split for another 186 years.

In that period, Split was to see one brief and final restoration of Imperial power in Dalmatia. The Byzantine Emperor Manuel I Komnenos began his campaigns against the Kingdom of Croatia and Hungary in 1151, and by 1164, had secured the submission of the Dalmatian cities back under Imperial rule. Having won a decisive victory against Kingdom of Croatia and Hungary in 1167 at the Battle of Sirmium, consolidating his gains, the Emperor suddenly broke with Venice as well, and sent a fleet of 150 ships to the Adriatic. Split was to remain in Byzantine hands until Manuel's death in 1180, when Béla III of Hungary moved to restore his power in Dalmatia. The city remained loyal to the Empire, resisting the re-establishment of Hungarian rule, and consequently, upon its inevitable submission, was punished with the King's refusal to renew its ancient privileges.

During the 20-year Hungarian civil war between King Sigismund and the Capetian House of Anjou of the Kingdom of Naples, the losing contender, Ladislaus of Naples, sold his disputed rights on Dalmatia to the Venetian Republic for 100,000 ducats in 1409. Acting on the pretext, the Republic took over in the city by the year 1420.

=== Venetian period ===
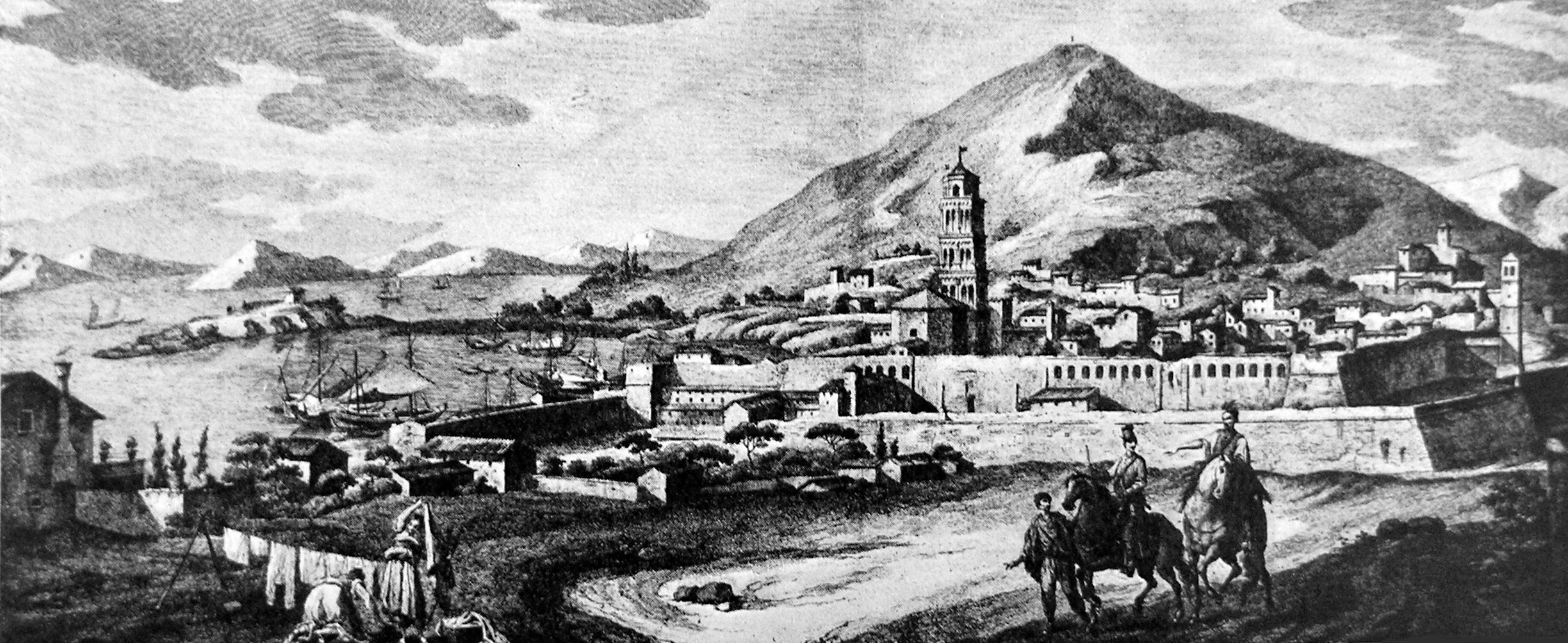
Overall view of Split in the Early modern period (1764), an engraving by Scottish architect Robert Adam. Marjan hill is visible in the background.

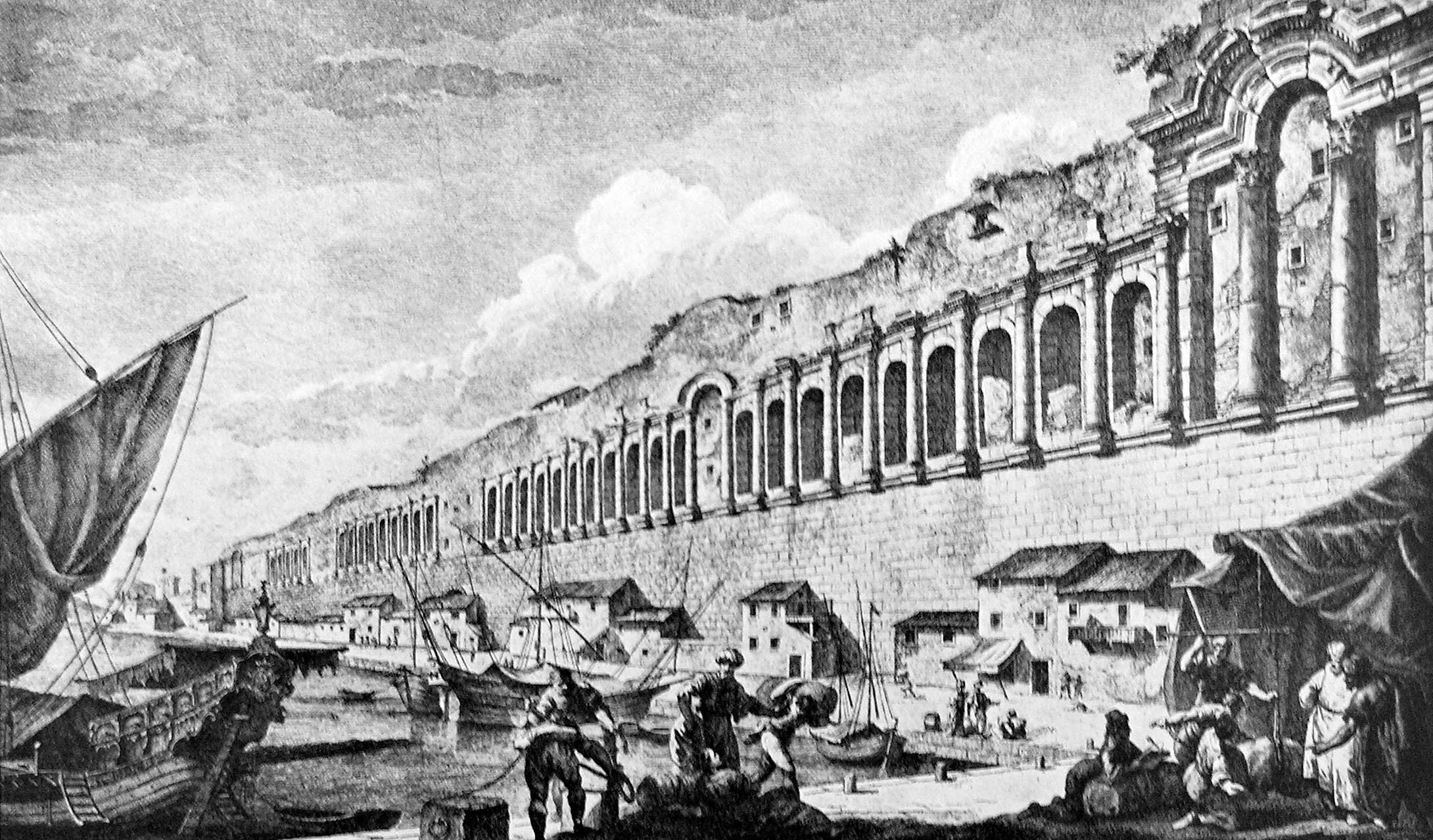
The city's seaward walls in 1764 in an engraving by Robert Adam.

By this time, the population was largely Croatian, while Romance Dalmatian names were not as common, according to the medieval city archives. The common language was Croatian, but a variety of the Venetian language with some Tuscan influences was also widely spoken by Dalmatian Italian notaries, school teachers, merchants, and officials. The city's autonomy was greatly reduced: the highest authority was a prince and captain (conte e capitanio), assigned by Venice.

Split eventually developed into a significant port-city, with important trade routes to the Ottoman-held interior through the nearby Klis pass. Culture flourished as well, Split being the hometown of Marko Marulić, the Croatian national poet. Marulić's most acclaimed work, Judita (1501), was an epic poem about Judith and Holofernes, widely held to be the first modern work of Croatian literature. It was written in Split and printed in Venice in 1521.

The advances and achievements were reserved mostly for the aristocracy: the illiteracy rate was extremely high, mostly because Venetian rule showed little interest in educational and medical facilities.

In 1797, Split was ceded by the French Republic to the Habsburg monarchy under the Treaty of Campo Formio, as part of the dissolution and partition of the ancient Republic of Venice.

=== Napoleonic wars ===
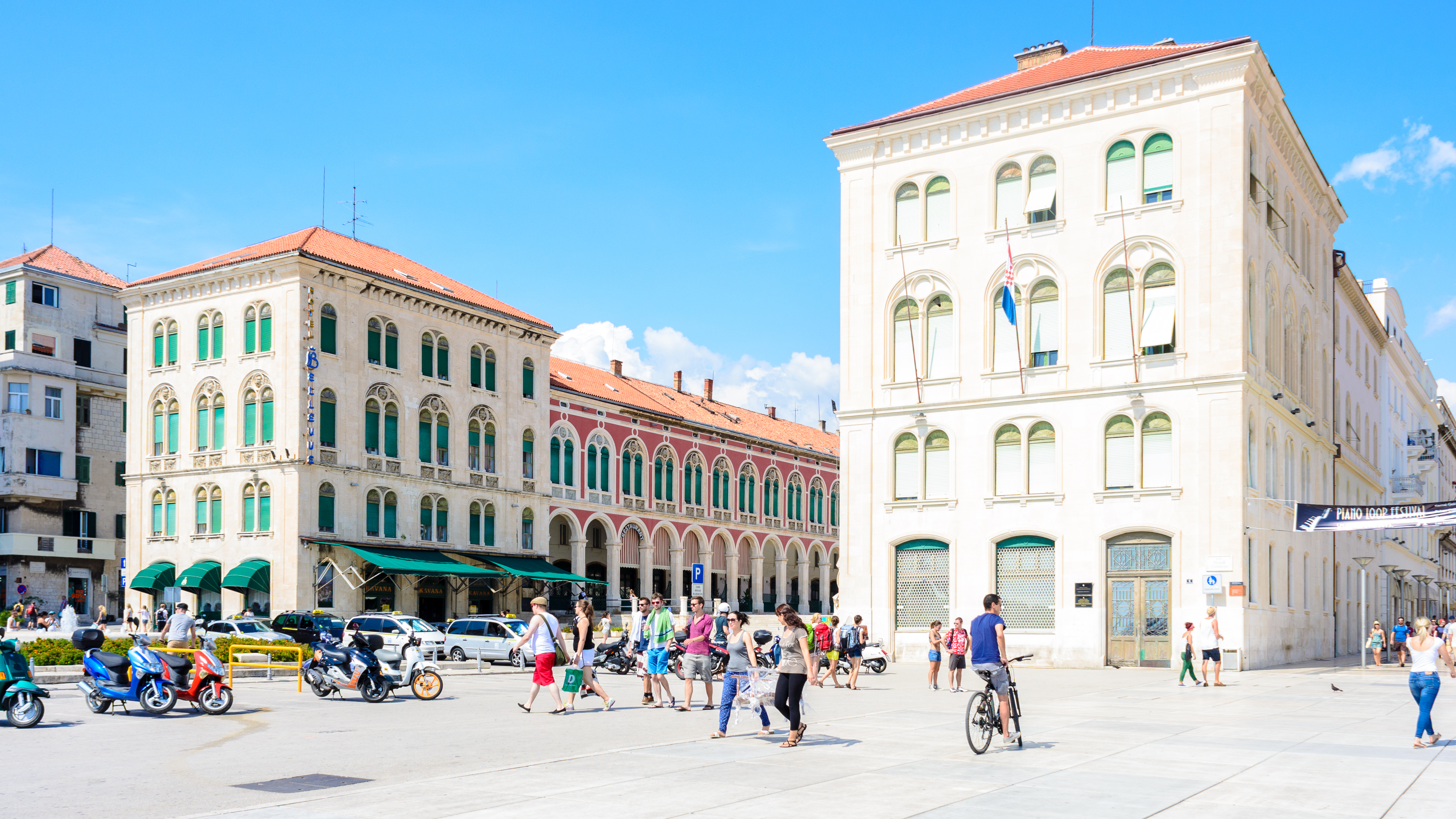
Prokurative (Republic Square), dating to the brief rule of the French Empire

Split became part of the Napoleonic Kingdom of Italy in 1805, after the defeat of the Third Coalition at the Battle of Austerlitz and the consequent Treaty of Pressburg. It was included directly in the French Empire in 1806. The same year, Vincenzo Dandolo was named provveditore generale and general Auguste de Marmont was named military commander of Dalmatia.

In 1809, after a brief war with France, Austria ceded Carinthia, Carniola, Croatia west of the Sava River, Gorizia and Trieste to France. These territories, along with Dalmatia, formed the Illyrian Provinces. During this period, large investments were undertaken in the city, new streets were built and parts of the ancient fortifications were removed. Austria, with help from a British force led by Captain William Hoste, occupied Split in November 1813. Following the Congress of Vienna in 1815, the city was officially ceded to Austria.

=== Under Habsburg rule ===
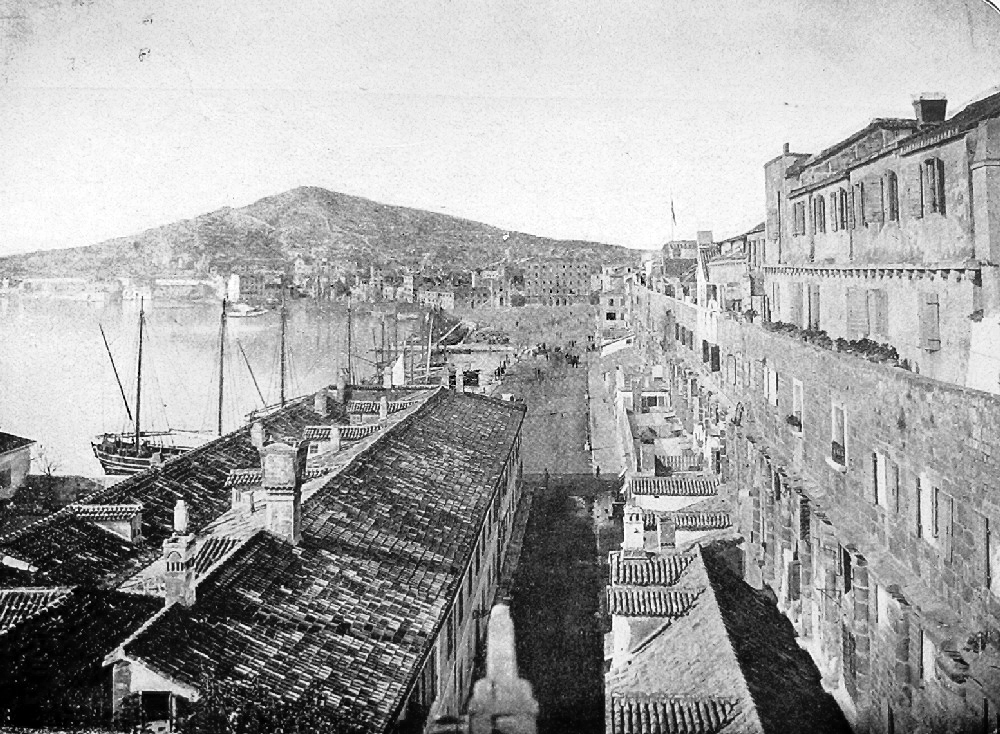
The Riva of Split in the 19th century, with Marjan hill in the background

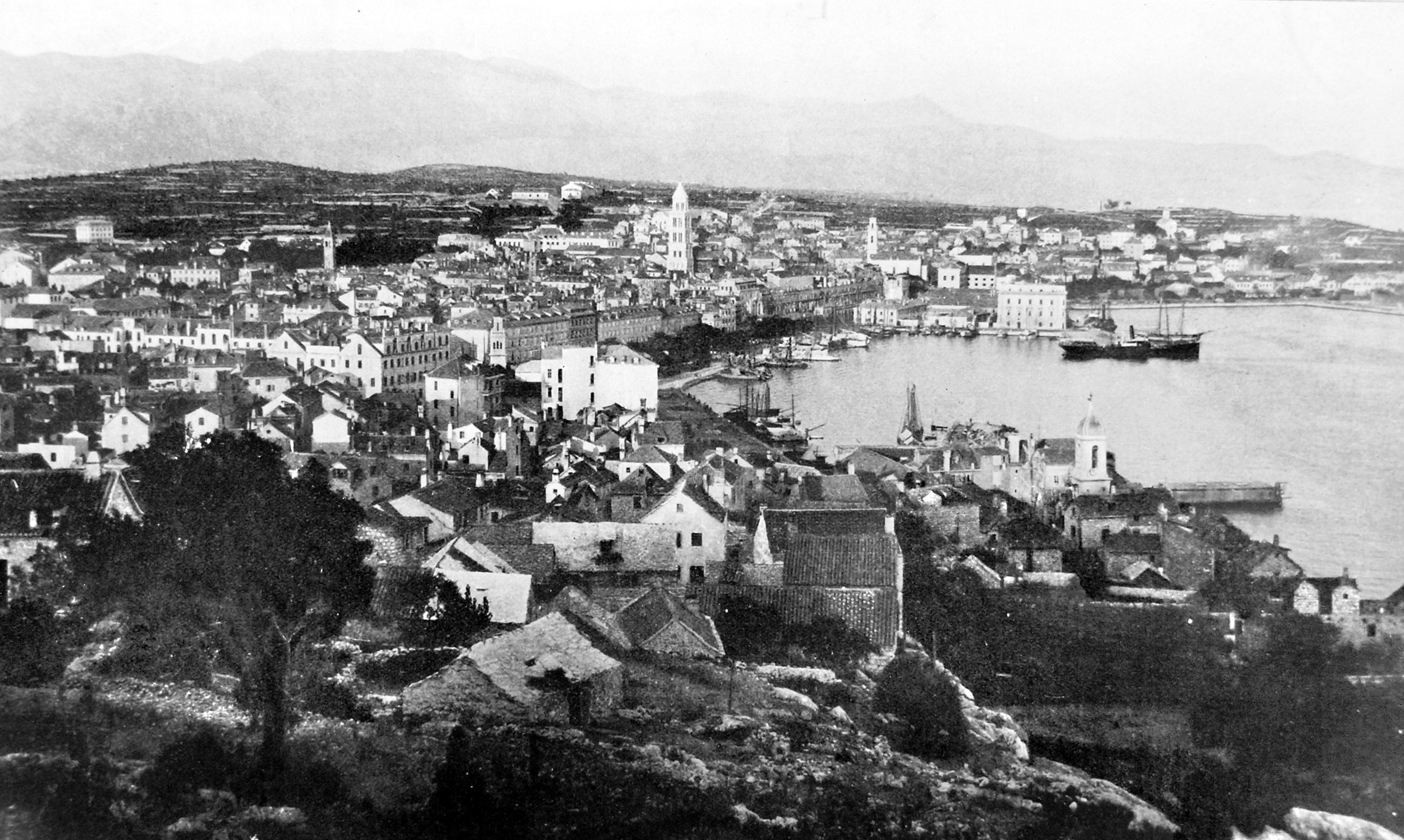
City center and the Riva promenade from the slopes of Marjan in 1910

The Split region became part of the Kingdom of Dalmatia, a separate administrative unit. After the revolutions of 1848 as a result of romantic nationalism, two factions appeared. One was the pro-Croatian Unionist faction (later called the Puntari, "Pointers"), led by the People's Party and, to a lesser extent, the Party of Rights, both of which advocated the union of Dalmatia with the Kingdom of Croatia-Slavonia which was under Hungarian administration. This faction was strongest in Split, and used it as its headquarters. The other faction was the pro-Italian Autonomist faction (also known as the "Irredentist" faction), whose political goals varied from autonomy within the Austro-Hungarian Empire, to a political union with the Kingdom of Italy.

The political alliances in Split shifted over time. At first, the Unionists and Autonomists were allied against the centralism of Vienna. After a while, when the national question came to prominence, they separated. Under Austria, Split generally stagnated. The great upheavals in Europe in 1848 gained no ground here, and the city did not rebel.

Antonio Bajamonti became Mayor of Split in 1860 and – except for a brief interruption during the period 1864–65 – held the post for over two decades until 1880. Bajamonti was also a member of the Dalmatian Sabor (1861–91) and the Austrian Chamber of Deputies (1867–1870 and 1873–1879). In 1882 Bajamonti's party lost the elections and Dujam Rendić-Miočević, a prominent city lawyer, was elected to the post.

=== As part of Yugoslavia ===
==== Kingdom of Yugoslavia ====
After the end of World War I and the dissolution of Austria-Hungary, the province of Dalmatia, along with Split, became a part of the Kingdom of Serbs, Croats and Slovenes. Split was occupied by the allies in the aftermath of the war and the site of a series of incidents between 1918 and 1920. Since Rijeka, Trieste and Zadar, the three other large cities on the eastern Adriatic coast, were annexed by Italy, Split became the most important port in the Kingdom. The Lika railway, connecting Split to the rest of the country, was completed in 1925. The country changed its name to the Kingdom of Yugoslavia in 1929, and the Port of Split became the seat of new administrative unit, Littoral Banovina. After the Cvetković-Maček agreement, Split became the part of new administrative unit (merging of Sava and Littoral Banovina plus some Croat populated areas), Banovina of Croatia in the Kingdom of Yugoslavia.

==== World War II ====
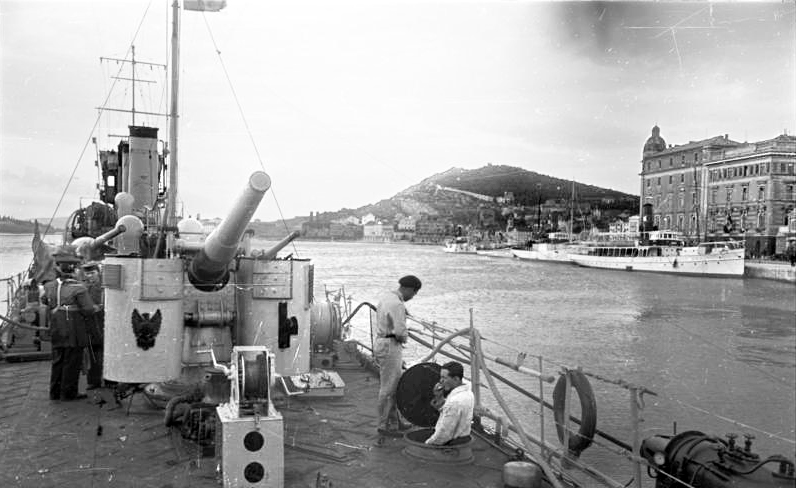
Italian warship in the City Harbour after the annexation into Italy in 1941

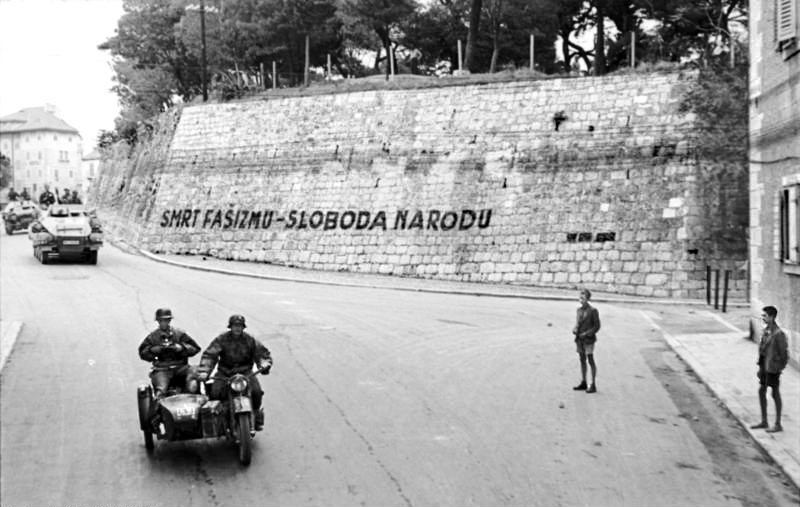
German vehicles in the city streets. The sign reads "Death to fascism – freedom to the people".

In April 1941, following the invasion of Yugoslavia by Nazi Germany, Split was occupied by Italy. Although Split formally became part of the Independent State of Croatia, the Ustaše were not able to establish and strengthen their rule in Split, as Italians assumed all power in Dalmatia. One month later, on 18 May 1941, when the Treaties of Rome were signed, Italy formally annexed Split, which was included in the province of Spalato, and large parts of Dalmatia down to Kotor. The Italian Governatorate of Dalmatia hosted 390,000 inhabitants, of which 280,000 Croats, 90,000 Serbs and 5,000 Dalmatian Italians. Italian rule met heavy opposition from the Croat population as Split became a centre of anti-fascist sentiment in Yugoslavia. The first armed resistance group was organized on 7 May 1941 and the 63 member strong 1st Strike Detachment (Prvi udarni odred) served as the basis for future formations, including the 1st Split Partisan Detachment. Between September and October 1941 alone, ten officials of the Italian fascist occupation were assassinated by the citizens. On 12 June 1942, a fascist mob attacked the city's synagogue, and destroyed its library and archive. Worshipers were beaten as they left the synagogue and Jewish-owned shops were targeted the following day. The local football clubs refused to compete in the Italian championship; HNK Hajduk and RNK Split suspended their activities and both joined the Partisans along with their entire staff after the Italian capitulation provided the opportunity. Soon after Hajduk became the official football club of the Partisan movement.

In September 1943, following the capitulation of Italy, the city was temporarily controlled by Marshal Josip Broz Tito's brigades with thousands of people volunteering to join the Partisans of Tito (a third of the total population, according to some sources). Eight thousand Italian soldiers from the 15th Infantry Division Bergamo prepared to fight alongside the Yugoslav Partisans against the Waffen-SS "Prinz Eugen". Italian General Becuzzi handed over to the Partisans 11 soldiers which they considered as "war criminals". The Partisans also executed up to 41 members of the Italian Police forces, later found in mass graves.

A few weeks later, the Partisans were forced into retreat as the Wehrmacht placed the city under the authority of the Independent State of Croatia. The Germans decimated the Italian soldiers as traitors, including three Generals (Policardi, Pelligra and Cigala Fulgosi) and 48 officials (Trelj massacre). In this period the last remaining symbols of Italian heritage in Split, including several Venetian Lions of St. Mark, were erased from the town.

In a tragic turn of events, besides being bombed by Axis forces, the city was also bombed by the Allies, causing hundreds of deaths. Partisans finally captured the city on 26 October 1944 and instituted it as the provisional capital of Croatia. The following month HMS Delhi arrived to host the surrender of the remaining German forces in the region. On 12 February 1945, the Kriegsmarine conducted a daring raid on Split harbour, damaging Delhi. After the war the remaining members of Dalmatian Italians of Split left Yugoslavia towards Italy (Istrian-Dalmatian exodus).

==== Federal Yugoslavia ====
The Yugoslav-era Coat of arms of Split. Introduced in 1967, it was based on the Medieval rectangular arms, dating at least from the 14th century (and likely much earlier).

After World War II, Split became a part of the Socialist Republic of Croatia, itself a constituent sovereign republic of the Socialist Federal Republic of Yugoslavia. During the period the city experienced its largest economic and demographic boom. Dozens of new factories and companies were founded with the city population tripling during the period. The city became the economic centre of an area exceeding the borders of Croatia and was flooded by waves of rural migrants from the undeveloped hinterland who found employment in the newly established industry, as part of large-scale industrialization and investment by the Yugoslav Federal Government.

The shipbuilding industry was particularly successful and Yugoslavia, with its Croatian shipyards, became one of the world's top nations in the field. Many recreational facilities were also constructed with federal funding, especially for the 1979 Mediterranean Games, such as the Poljud Stadium. The city also became the largest passenger and military port in Yugoslavia, housing the headquarters of the Yugoslav Navy (Jugoslavenska ratna mornarica, JRM) and the Army's Coastal Military District (equivalent of a field army). In the period between 1945 and 1990, the city was transformed and expanded, taking up the vast majority of the Split peninsula. In the same period it achieved an as yet unsurpassed GDP and employment level, still above the present day's, growing into a significant Yugoslav city.

=== Since independence ===
When Croatia declared its independence again in 1991, Split had a large garrison of Yugoslav People's Army (JNA) troops (drafted from all over Yugoslavia), as well as the headquarters and facilities of the Yugoslav Navy (JRM). This led to a tense months-long stand-off between the JNA and Croatian National Guard and police forces, occasionally flaring up in various incidents. The most tragic incident occurred on 15 November 1991, when the JRM light frigate Split fired a small number of shells at the city and its surroundings. The damage was insignificant but there were a few casualties. Three general locations were bombarded: the old city center, the city airport, and an uninhabited part of the hills above Kaštela, between the airport and Split. JRM sailors, most of them Croats themselves, who had refused to attack Croat civilians were left in the vessel's brig. The JNA and JRM evacuated all of its facilities in Split during January 1992. The 1990s economic recession soon followed.

In the years following 2000, Split finally gained momentum and started to develop again, with a focus on tourism. From being just a transport centre, Split is now a major Croatian tourist destination. Many new hotels are being built, as well as new apartment and office buildings. Many large development projects are being revived, and new infrastructure is being built. An example of one of the latest large city projects is the Spaladium Arena, built in 2009.

== Geography ==
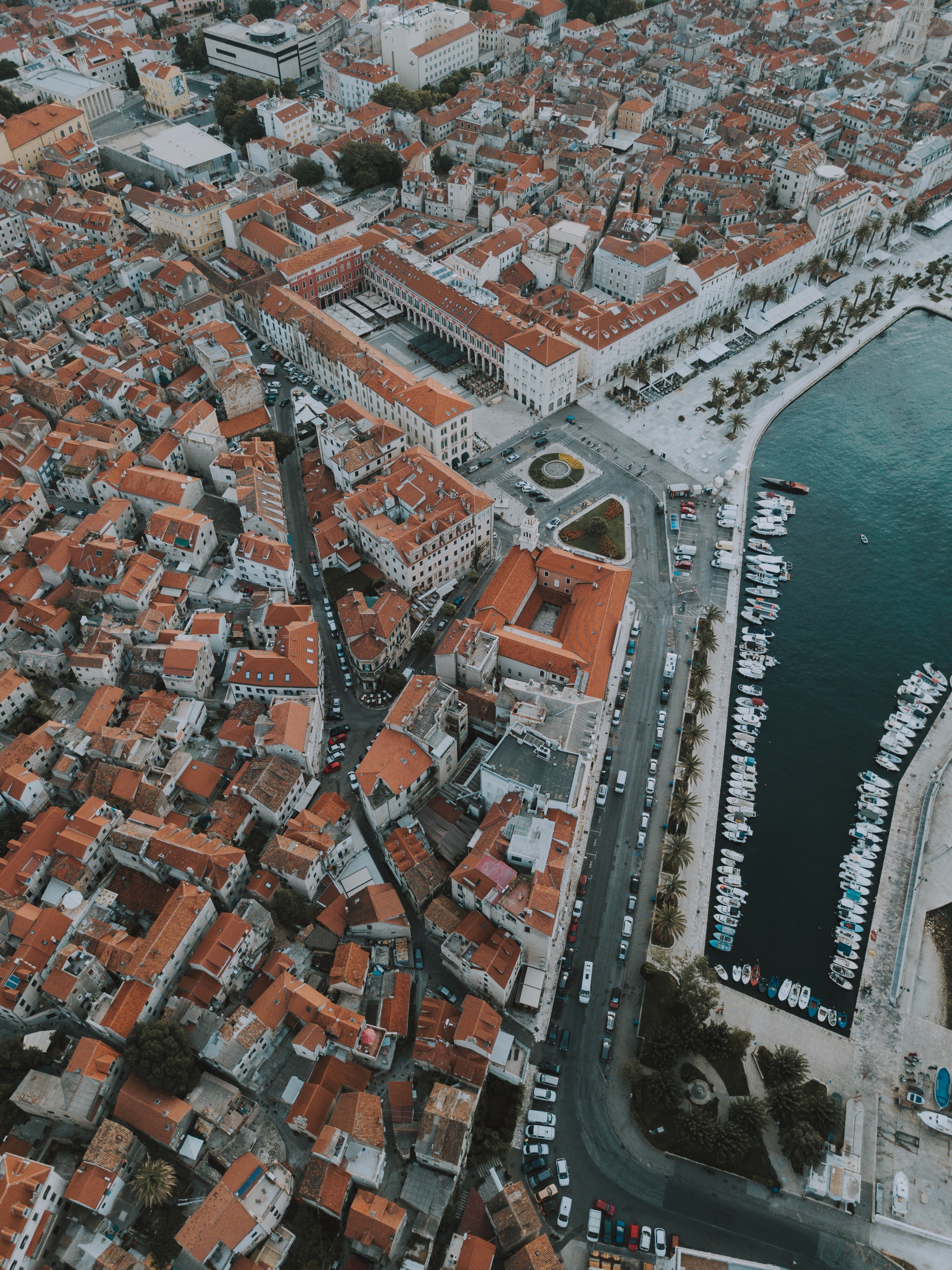
Historical city center of Split

Split is situated on a peninsula between the eastern part of the Gulf of Kaštela and the Split Channel. The Marjan hill (178 m; 584 ft), rises in the western part of the peninsula. The Kozjak (779 m; 2,556 ft) and Mosor (1,339 m; 4,393 ft) ridges protect the city from the north and northeast, and separate it from the hinterland.

Split is administratively divided into 34 city kotars:

- Bačvice
- Blatine-Škrape
- Bol
- Brda
- Grad
- Gripe
- Kman
- Kocunar
- Lokve
- Lovret
- Lučac-Manuš
- Mejaši
- Meje
- Mertojak
- Neslanovac
- Plokite
- Pujanke
- Ravne njive
- Sirobuja
- Skalice
- Split 3
- Sućidar
- Šine
- Spinut
- Trstenik
- Veli Varoš
- Visoka
- Žnjan

== Climate ==
Split has a hot-summer Mediterranean climate (Köppen climate classification: Csa), that is bordering closely on a humid subtropical climate (Köppen climate classification: Cfa). It experiences hot, moderately dry summers and mild, wet winters, which can occasionally feel cold, because of a strong northern wind, termed bura.

January is the coldest month, with an average low temperature around 6 °C (43 °F). July is the hottest month, with an average high temperature around 31 °C (88 °F). Average annual rainfall is around 800 mm (31.50 in). November is the wettest month, with a precipitation total of nearly 120 mm (4.72 in) and 12 rainy days. July is the driest month, with a precipitation total of around 25 mm (0.98 in). Snow is usually rare, though in February 2012, during cold wave in Europe, Split received a record snowfall of 25 cm (9.84 in), which caused major problems with traffic. Split receives more than 2,698 sunshine hours annually.

In July 2017, Croatian firefighters battled to control a forest fire along the Adriatic coast that damaged and destroyed buildings in villages around the city of Split. The highest temperature ever recorded in the city was 40.2 °C (104.36 °F) on 12 August 2026. At Split Airport (Resnik), a temperature of 42.2 °C (108.0 °F) was recorded on 2 August 2017.

Climate data for Split (Marjan Hill, 1991–2020, extremes 1926–present)
Month	Jan	Feb	Mar	Apr	May	Jun	Jul	Aug	Sep	Oct	Nov	Dec	Year
Record high °C (°F)	17.4 (63.3)	22.3 (72.1)	24.3 (75.7)	27.7 (81.9)	33.2 (91.8)	39.5 (103.1)	38.6 (101.5)	40.2 (104.4)	35.5 (95.9)	27.9 (82.2)	25.8 (78.4)	18.7 (65.7)	40.2 (104.4)
Mean maximum °C (°F)	15.6 (60.1)	16.5 (61.7)	19.8 (67.6)	23.4 (74.1)	28.1 (82.6)	32.7 (90.9)	35.8 (96.4)	36.2 (97.2)	31.4 (88.5)	26.5 (79.7)	20.3 (68.5)	16.7 (62.1)	37.0 (98.6)
Mean daily maximum °C (°F)	10.7 (51.3)	11.5 (52.7)	14.5 (58.1)	18.4 (65.1)	23.4 (74.1)	28.1 (82.6)	31.0 (87.8)	30.9 (87.6)	25.4 (77.7)	20.5 (68.9)	15.6 (60.1)	11.8 (53.2)	20.2 (68.3)
Daily mean °C (°F)	8.2 (46.8)	8.7 (47.7)	11.3 (52.3)	14.9 (58.8)	19.7 (67.5)	24.2 (75.6)	26.8 (80.2)	26.8 (80.2)	21.7 (71.1)	17.4 (63.3)	13.1 (55.6)	9.4 (48.9)	16.8 (62.3)
Mean daily minimum °C (°F)	5.9 (42.6)	6.0 (42.8)	8.5 (47.3)	11.8 (53.2)	16.1 (61.0)	20.2 (68.4)	22.8 (73.0)	22.9 (73.2)	18.4 (65.1)	14.7 (58.5)	10.8 (51.4)	7.2 (45.0)	13.8 (56.8)
Mean minimum °C (°F)	−1.5 (29.3)	−0.8 (30.6)	1.6 (34.9)	5.4 (41.7)	9.8 (49.6)	13.9 (57.0)	16.8 (62.2)	17.0 (62.6)	12.8 (55.0)	8.7 (47.7)	4.2 (39.6)	−0.4 (31.3)	−2.5 (27.5)
Record low °C (°F)	−9.0 (15.8)	−8.1 (17.4)	−6.6 (20.1)	0.3 (32.5)	4.8 (40.6)	9.1 (48.4)	13.0 (55.4)	11.2 (52.2)	8.8 (47.8)	3.8 (38.8)	−4.5 (23.9)	−6.3 (20.7)	−9.0 (15.8)
Average precipitation mm (inches)	72.7 (2.86)	63.8 (2.51)	58.4 (2.30)	62.0 (2.44)	57.8 (2.28)	49.2 (1.94)	24.6 (0.97)	31.7 (1.25)	82.3 (3.24)	79.6 (3.13)	119.8 (4.72)	98.7 (3.89)	800.6 (31.53)
Average precipitation days (≥ 0.1 mm)	10.5	9.4	9.6	10.4	9.4	7.8	5.1	4.6	8.2	9.3	11.7	11.9	107.9
Average snowy days	0.3	0.6	0.3	0	0	0	0	0	0	0	0.1	0.2	1.5
Average relative humidity (%)	61	59	59	59	56	53	49	51	58	63	65	61	58
Mean monthly sunshine hours	139.5	151.7	195.1	221.5	277.9	317.8	358.7	335.0	246.3	197.8	129.3	127.9	2,698.5
Percentage possible sunshine	47	55	54	56	65	72	81	79	70	61	50	48	63
Source 1: NOAA NCEI
Source 2: Croatian Meteorological and Hydrological Service(percent sun-extremes)

Climate data for Split
Month	Jan	Feb	Mar	Apr	May	Jun	Jul	Aug	Sep	Oct	Nov	Dec	Year
Mean No. of days with Maximum temperature ≥ 30.0 °C (86.0 °F)	0	0	0	0	0.7	9.7	20.8	20.5	2.5	0	0	0	54.2
Mean No. of days with Minimum temperature < 0.0 °C (32.0 °F)	1.4	2.0	0.4	0	0	0	0	0	0	0	0	0.9	4.8
Mean No. of days with Precipitation ≥ 10.0 mm (0.39 in)	2.7	2.3	1.9	2.1	2.0	1.5	0.6	1.0	2.7	2.4	4.0	3.3	26.7
Mean No. of days with Snow Depth ≥ 1.0 cm (0.39 in)	0	0.7	0	0	0	0	0	0	0	0	0	0	0.7
Mean number of days with thunder	2.2	1.8	1.7	2.5	3.7	4.6	3.8	4.1	4.7	3.1	4.2	2.7	39
Mean number of days with hail	0.3	0.3	0.3	0.1	0.1	0.2	0.1	0.0	0.1	0.2	0.2	0.2	2.2
Mean number of days with fog/Ice fog	0.1	0.3	0.4	0.3	0.1	0.0	0.1	0.1	0.0	0.1	0.1	0.0	1.7

Average sea temperature:
Jan	Feb	Mar	Apr	May	Jun	Jul	Aug	Sep	Oct	Nov	Dec	Year
12.0 °C (53.6 °F)	11.5 °C (52.7 °F)	11.9 °C (53.4 °F)	13.8 °C (56.8 °F)	17.3 °C (63.1 °F)	21.1 °C (70.0 °F)	23.2 °C (73.8 °F)	23.6 °C (74.5 °F)	21.7 °C (71.1 °F)	19.3 °C (66.7 °F)	16.4 °C (61.5 °F)	13.7 °C (56.7 °F)	17.1 °C (62.8 °F)

== Demographics ==
Historical population
Year	Pop.	±%
1857	12,417	—
1869	14,587	+17.5%
1880	16,883	+15.7%
1890	18,483	+9.5%
1900	21,925	+18.6%
1910	25,103	+14.5%
1921	29,155	+16.1%
1931	40,029	+37.3%
1948	54,187	+35.4%
1953	64,874	+19.7%
1961	85,374	+31.6%
1971	129,203	+51.3%
1981	176,303	+36.5%
1991	200,459	+13.7%
2001	188,694	−5.9%
2011	178,102	−5.6%
2021	160,577	−9.8%

According to the 2021 census, the city of Split had 160,577 inhabitants. Ethnically, Croats make up 96.42% of the population, and 77.53% of the residents of the city are Roman Catholics.

The settlements included in the administrative area of the city (2011) are:

- Donje Sitno, population 313
- Gornje Sitno, population 392
- Kamen, population 1,769
- Slatine, population 1,106
- Split, population 167,121
- Srinjine, population 1,201
- Stobreč, population 4,978
- Žrnovnica, population 3,222

In 2021, there were around 310,000 people in the Split metropolitan area, which includes the cities of Split, Kaštela, Omiš, Sinj, Solin, Trogir and the municipalities of Dicmo, Dugi Rat, Dugopolje, Klis, Lećevica, Muć, and Podstrana. In 2011, the entire Split-Dalmatia County had 454,798 residents, and the whole region of Dalmatia just under a million.

City of Split: Population trends 1857–2021
v

population	12417	14587	16883	18438	21925	25103	29155	40029	54187	64874	85374	129203	176303	200459	188694	178102	160577
	1857	1869	1880	1890	1900	1910	1921	1931	1948	1953	1961	1971	1981	1991	2001	2011	2021

Sources: Croatian Bureau of Statistics publications

Throughout history, there was a significant Italian-speaking community in Split. According to the Austrian censuses, there were 1,969 residents of the central settlement that used Italian as their habitual language (12.5% of the total population) in 1890, and 2,082 (9.7%) in 1910. The commune as a whole had 1,971 (8.7%) Italian speakers in 1890, and 2,087 (7.5%) in 1910. In 2011, only 83 people declared themselves as Italians, corresponding to 0.05% of the total population.

=== Inhabitants ===
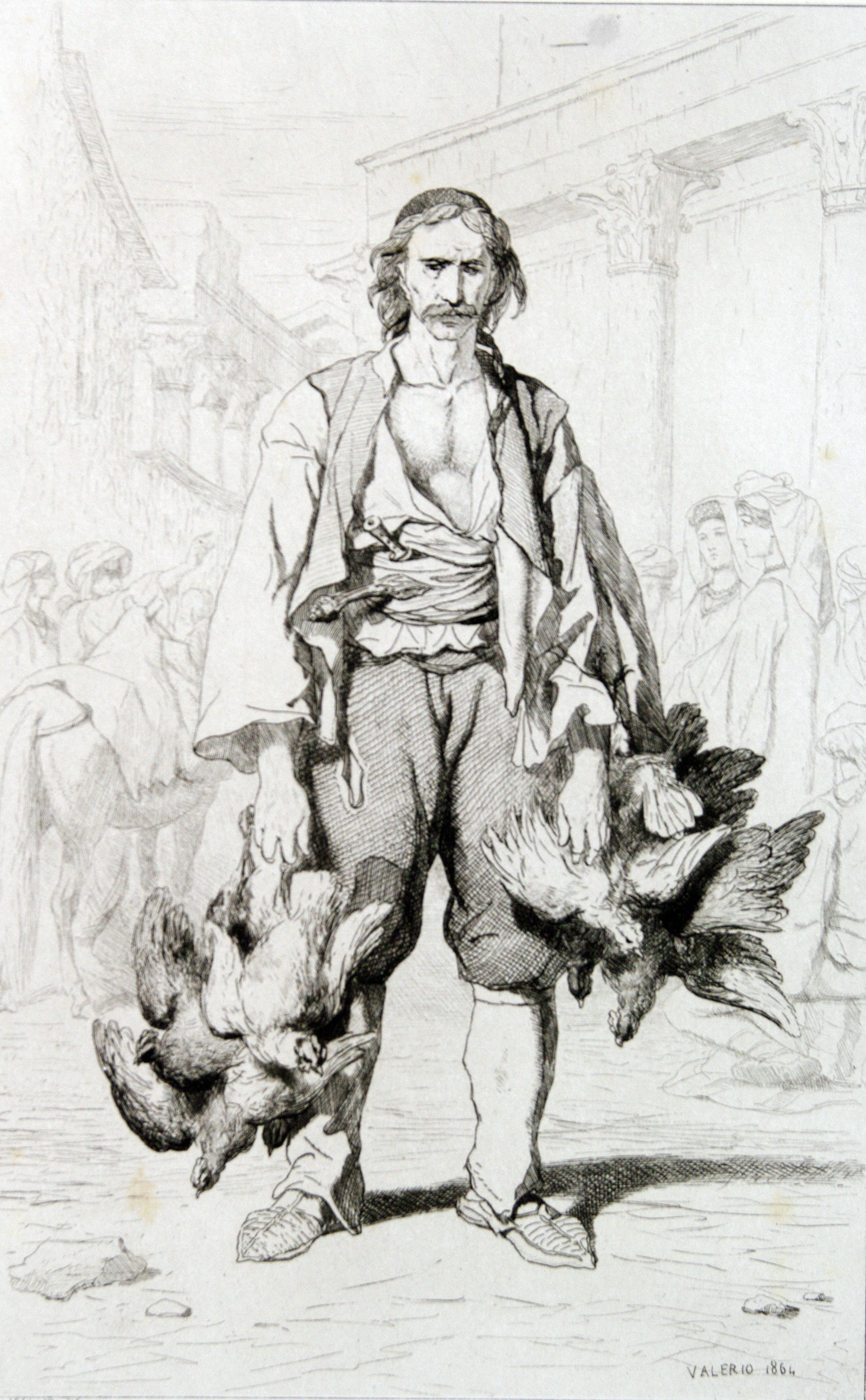
A "Morlach" (Vlaj) peasant in Split, 1864

Although the inhabitants of Split (Splićani) may appear to be a homogeneous body, they traditionally belong to three groups. The old urban families, the Fetivi, (short for "Fetivi Splićani", "real Split natives") are generally very proud of their city, its history and its distinctive traditional speech (a variant of the Chakavian dialect). The Fetivi, now a distinct minority, are sometimes referred to (semi-derogatorily) as "Mandrili" and are augmented by the so-called Boduli, immigrants from the nearby Adriatic islands who mostly arrived over the course of the 20th century.

The above two groups are distinct, in the Mediterranean aspects of their ethnicity and traditional Chakavian speech, from the more numerous Shtokavian-speaking immigrants from the rural Zagora hinterland, referred to as the Vlaji (a term that sometimes carries negative connotations). The latter joined the Fetivi and Boduli as a third group in the decades since World War II, thronging the high-rise suburbs that stretch away from the centre. By now the Vlaji constitute a decided majority of inhabitants, causing a distinct shift in the overall ethnic characteristics of the city. Historically more influenced by Ottoman culture, their population merges almost seamlessly at the eastern border with the Herzegovinian Croats and southern Bosnia and Herzegovina in general. Local jokes have always condemned the Vlaji to playing the role of rural unsophisticates, although it is often conceded that it was their hard work in the industries of the post-WWII era that made modern-day Split what it is now.

== Economy ==
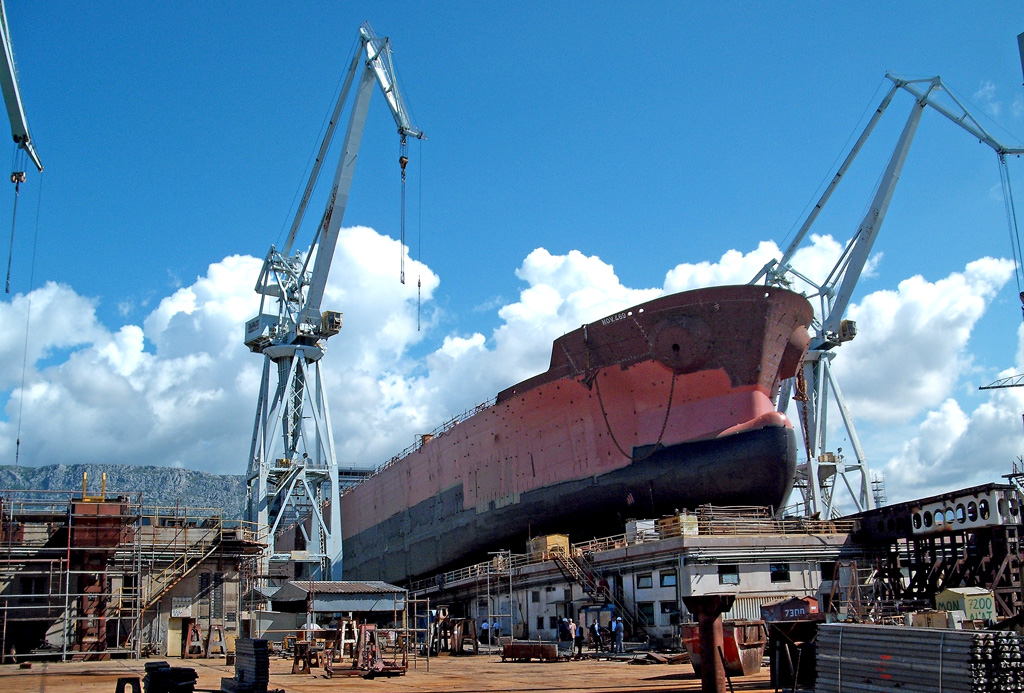
Juice carrier sitting on a slipway at Brodosplit

Split's economy is still suffering the backlash from the recession caused by the transfer to a market economy and privatization. In the Yugoslav era, the city had been a highly significant economic centre with a modern and diverse industrial and economic base, including shipbuilding, food, chemical, plastics, textile, and paper industry, in addition to large revenues from tourism. In 1981 Split's GDP per capita was 37% above the Yugoslav average. Today, most of the factories are out of business (or are far below pre-war production and employment capacity) and the city has been trying to concentrate on commerce and services, consequently leaving an alarmingly large number of factory workers unemployed.

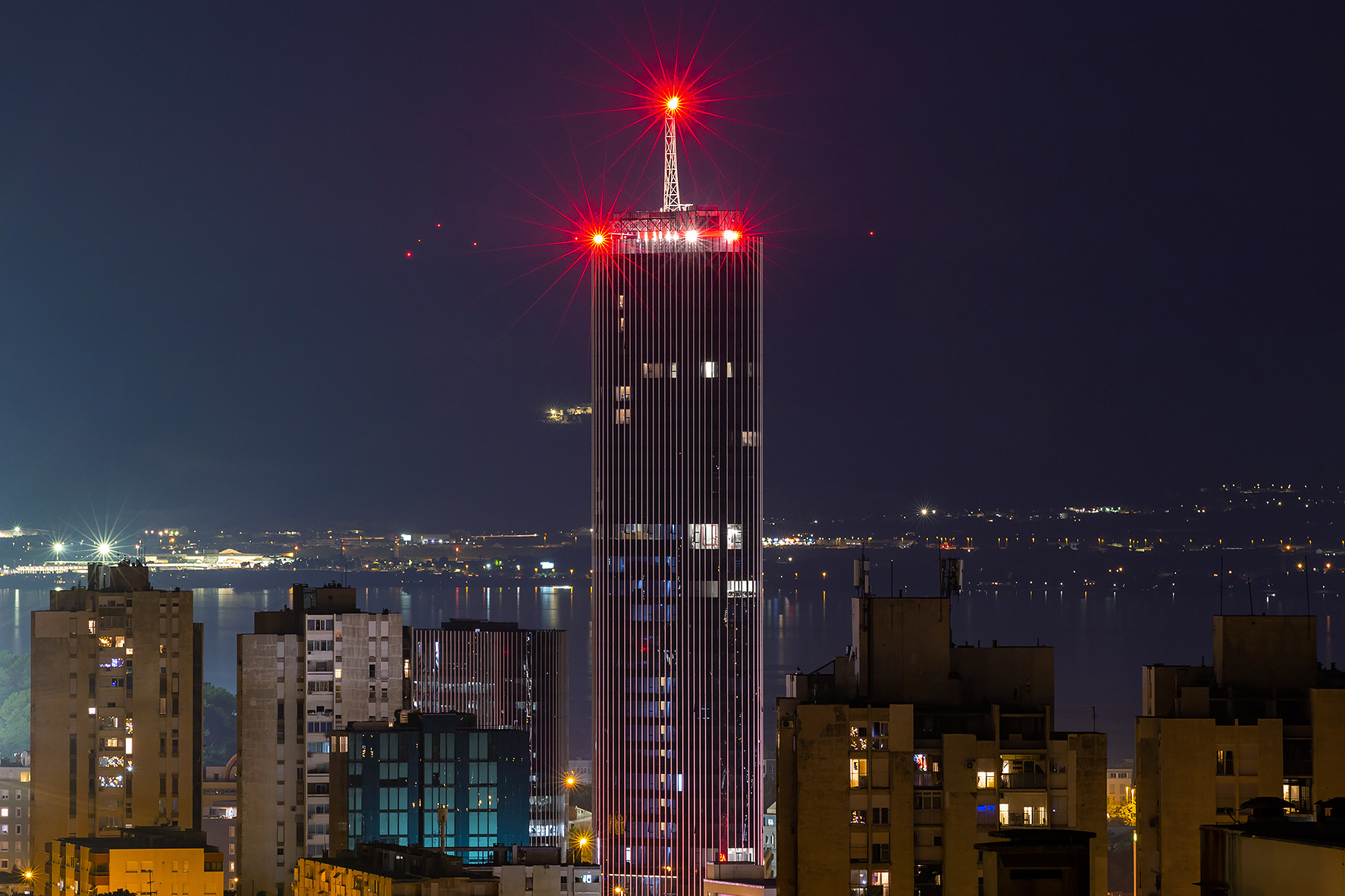
Dalmatia Tower, the tallest skyscraper in Croatia

Brodosplit is the largest shipyard in Croatia. It employs around 2,300 people, and has built over 350 vessels, including many tankers, both panamax and non-panamax, as well as container ships, bulk carriers, dredgers, off-shore platforms, frigates, submarines, patrol boats and passenger ships. 80% of the ships built are exported to foreign contractors.

The new A1 motorway, integrating Split with the rest of the Croatian freeway network, has helped stimulate economic production and investment, with new businesses being built in the city centre and its wildly sprawling suburbs. The entire route was opened in July 2005. Today, the city's economy relies mostly on trade and tourism with some old industries undergoing partial revival, such as food (fishing, olive, wine production), paper, concrete and chemicals. Since 1998, Split has been host to the annual Croatia Boat Show.

=== Tourism ===
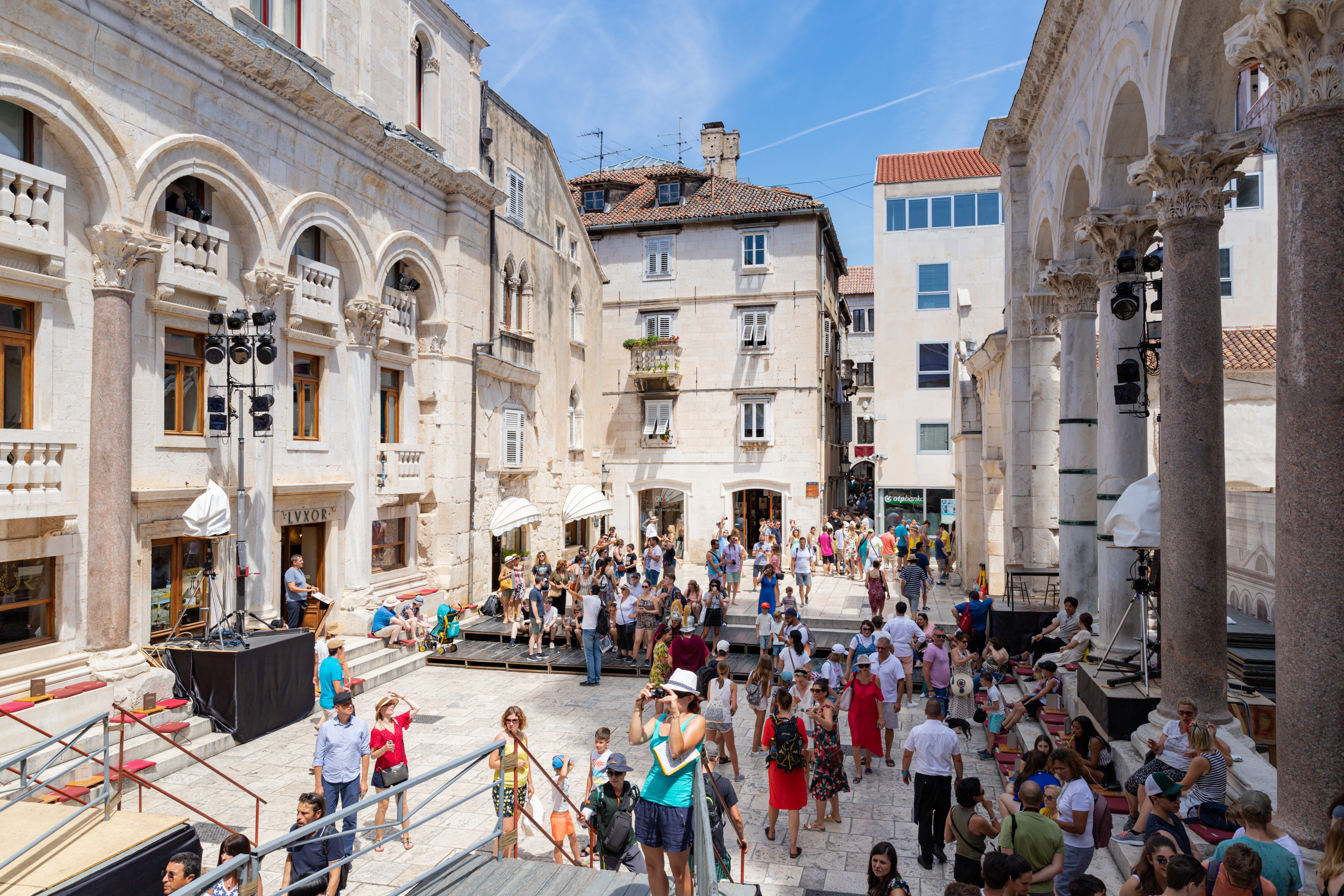
Tourists in Peristil in Diocletian's Palace

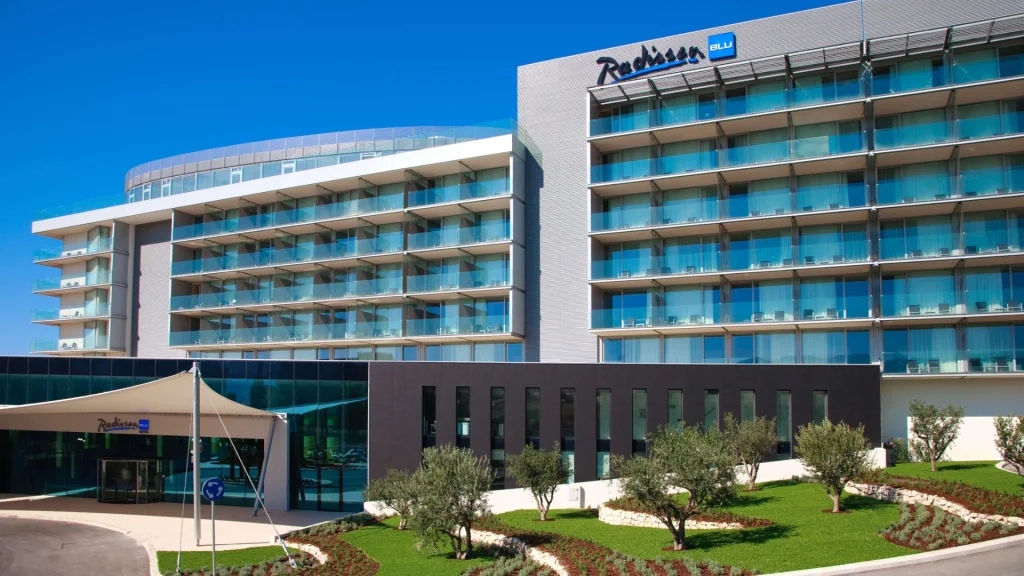
Radisson Blu Resort & Hotel in Split

Tourism plays a crucial role in Split's and Croatia's economy. With over 900,000 visits each year, Split makes one of the most visited cities in Croatia and in Europe. The largest tourist region of Dalmatia is the part around its largest city. Split is the location of the most valuable cultural monuments. The Split part of Dalmatia shared the same historical fate as other parts of Dalmatia, but because of its central position and protection by the vast hinterland, it was less exposed to devastation than its neighbouring regions. It is for that reason that so many people live in Split. Near Split are the other large all the large Dalmatian islands – Brač, Šolta, Čiovo, Hvar and Vis, which are all well connected with Port of Split.

In 2023, Split had a record number of tourists, 965,405 visits and 3,050,389 overnight stays. In addition to that, the impact of tourism in Split had the international events and gatherings such as the Ultra Europe electronic music festival, who every July brings more than 150,000 people each year, which was annually held on Poljud Stadium, until it was moved to Park mladeži ("Youth Park") in 2019. Cultural impact played also a big role in Split's tourism, including filming of international TV series Game of Thrones, which used locations of Diocletian's Palace, Klis Fortress, Žrnovnica quarry and watermill, as well filming of Bliss, starring Owen Wilson and Salma Hayek.

== Main sights ==
=== Riva ===
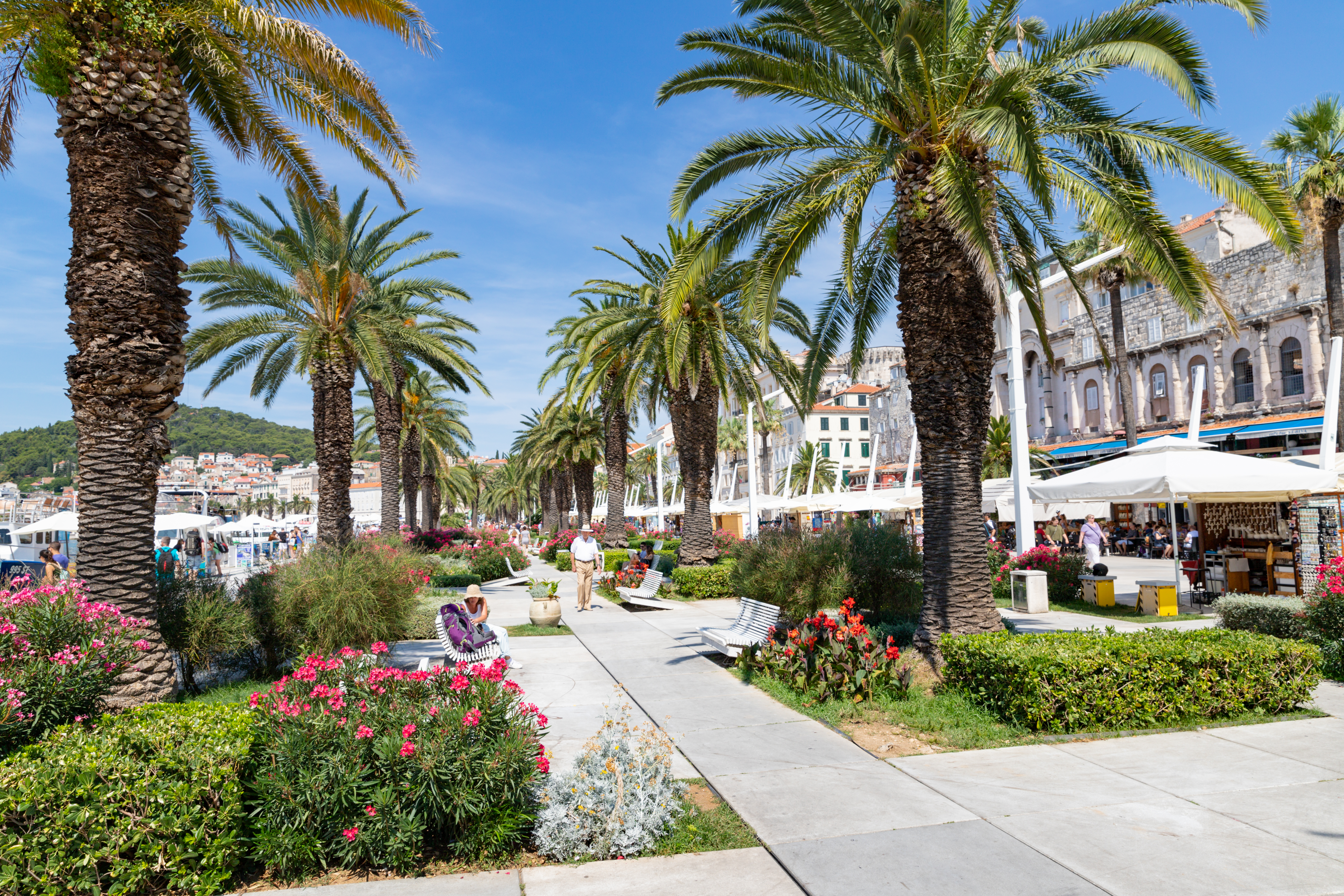
Split promenade, known locally as Riva

The Croatian National Revival Coast, Splitska riva or Riva, is a main pedestrian street in Split dedicated to the Croatian National Revival from the 18th and 19th centuries. It began to take on its current form under the rule of the French Empire, as a result of the 1807 order of Marshal Marmont. Fearing the takeover of the city from the sea by Britain and Russia, Marmont ordered the demolition of the southern part of the Venetian castle on the coast, the western half-bastion of San Antonio and the cortina between that half-bastion and the Priuli bastion. It was a busy street until the 1990s, when it was converted into a pedestrian zone, today becoming the most popular pedestrian zone in Split. It has been decorated with palms since early 20th century.

=== Narodni Trg ===
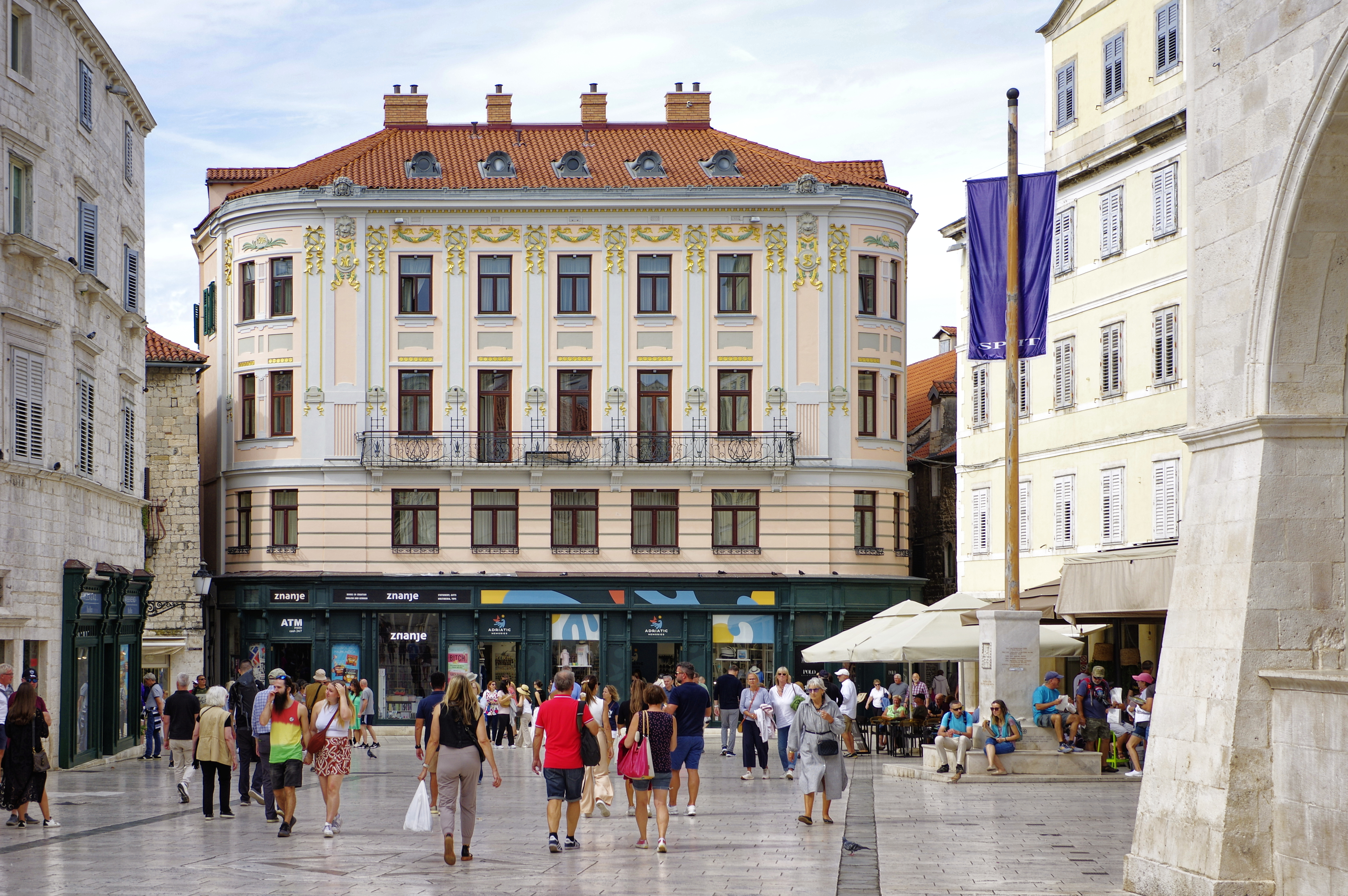
Narodni Trg or Pjaca

Narodni Trg or Pjaca is a public city square created by the urban expansion of the city west of the Iron Gates of Diocletian's Palace. Previously known as Lovrin Trg, the square often changed its name throughout history; Trg oružja, Gospodski trg so that at the beginning of the 20th century it got the name it still bears today – Narodni trg. The square houses the oldest bookstore in Split, opened since 1861, once owned by the Morpurgo family, after whom it still bears its name today. A lot of historical buildings are on the square including: Old Town Hall, Romanesque tower with bell tower and clock, Ciprian's Palace, Karepić Palace, Cambi Palace, Nakić House.

=== Marjan ===
Marjan hill above the city is a hill on peninsula. The park/forest cover an area of approximately 3.5 x 1.5 kilometers, or 347 hectares. The importance of this peninsula for Split is also shown by one of the city's nicknames, which is 'The City under Marjan'. Marjan is a favorite promenade in Split, and is also very popular among runners and popular observation lookout of Split's old town.

=== Split Cathedral ===
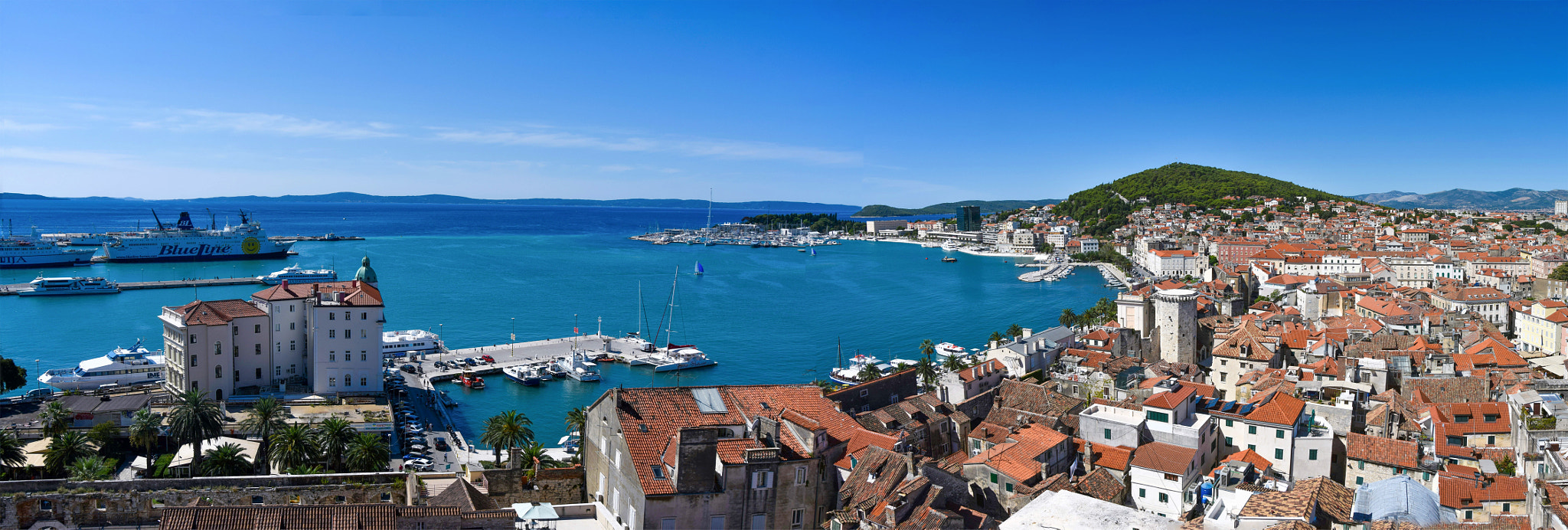
Panoramic view of Port of Split, Split's waterfront and Marjan Hill. View from top of the tower bell of Split Cathedral.

Split Cathedral or Cathedral of Saint Domnius is a Cathedral located in the mausoleum of the Emperor Diocletian, which was slightly converted for his function and interior was equipped with valuable religious items. In front of its entrance, a magnificent 57m tall Romanesque bell tower was built in the 12th century. The mausoleum became a cathedral in the mid-7th century, when altars with relics of two martyrs executed in neighboring Solin (then Salona)—St. Anastasius and St. Domnius—were placed in it. After the latter, the church is now usually called the Cathedral of St. Duje and he became the patron saint of Split, but the real name of the Split Cathedral is the Cathedral of the Assumption of the Blessed Virgin Mary.

=== Museums and galleries ===
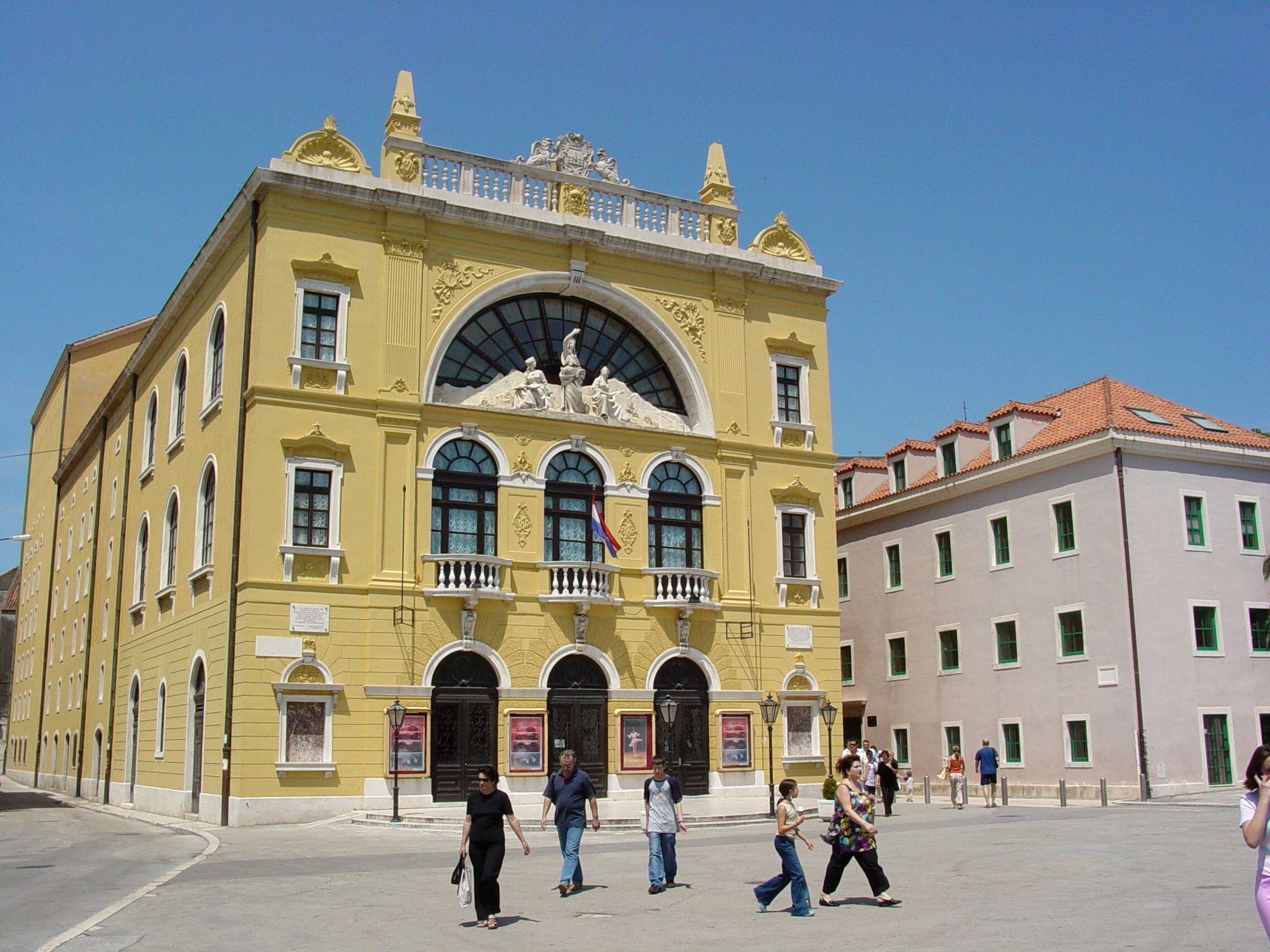
The Croatian National Theatre, built in 1893

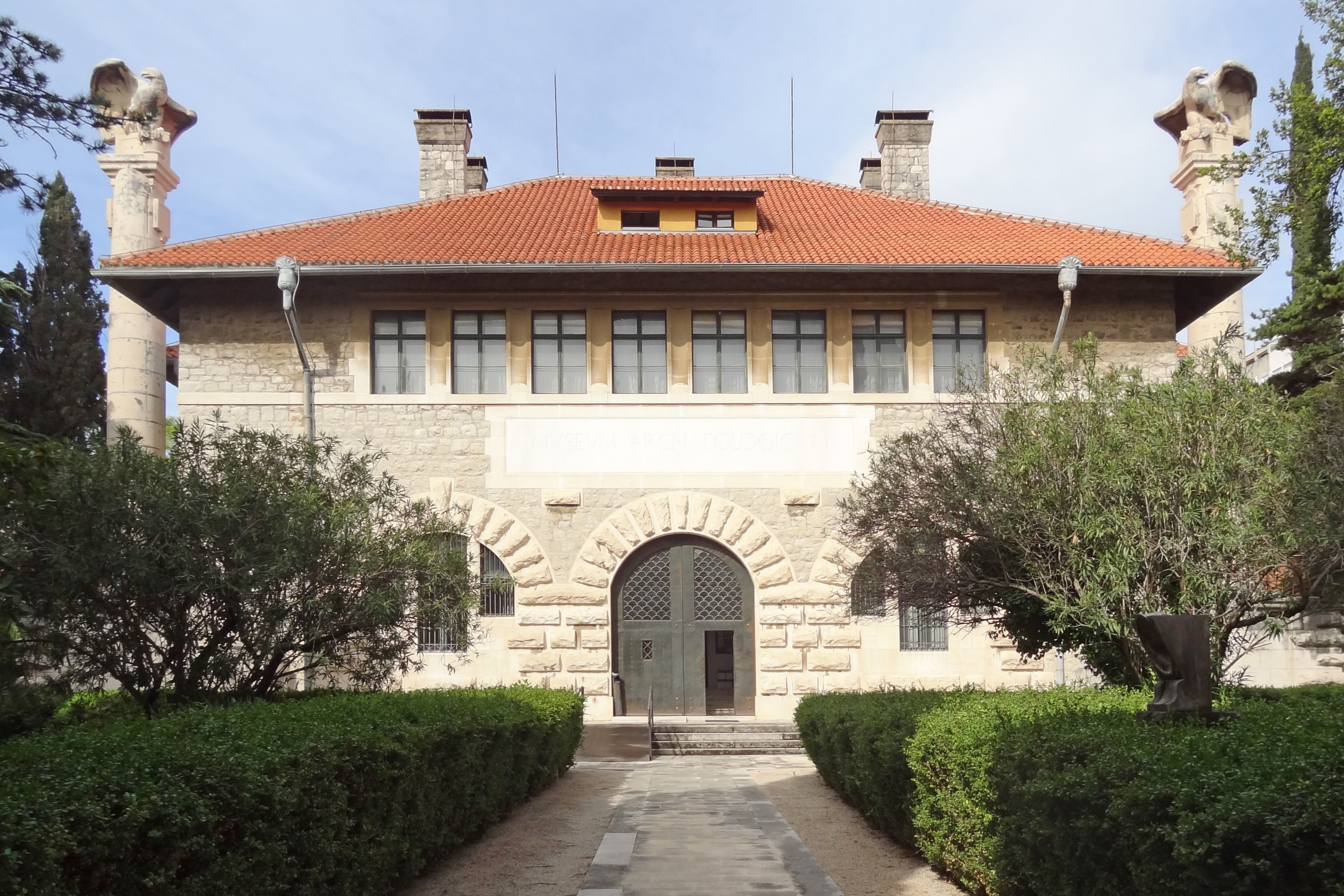
Split Archaeological Museum

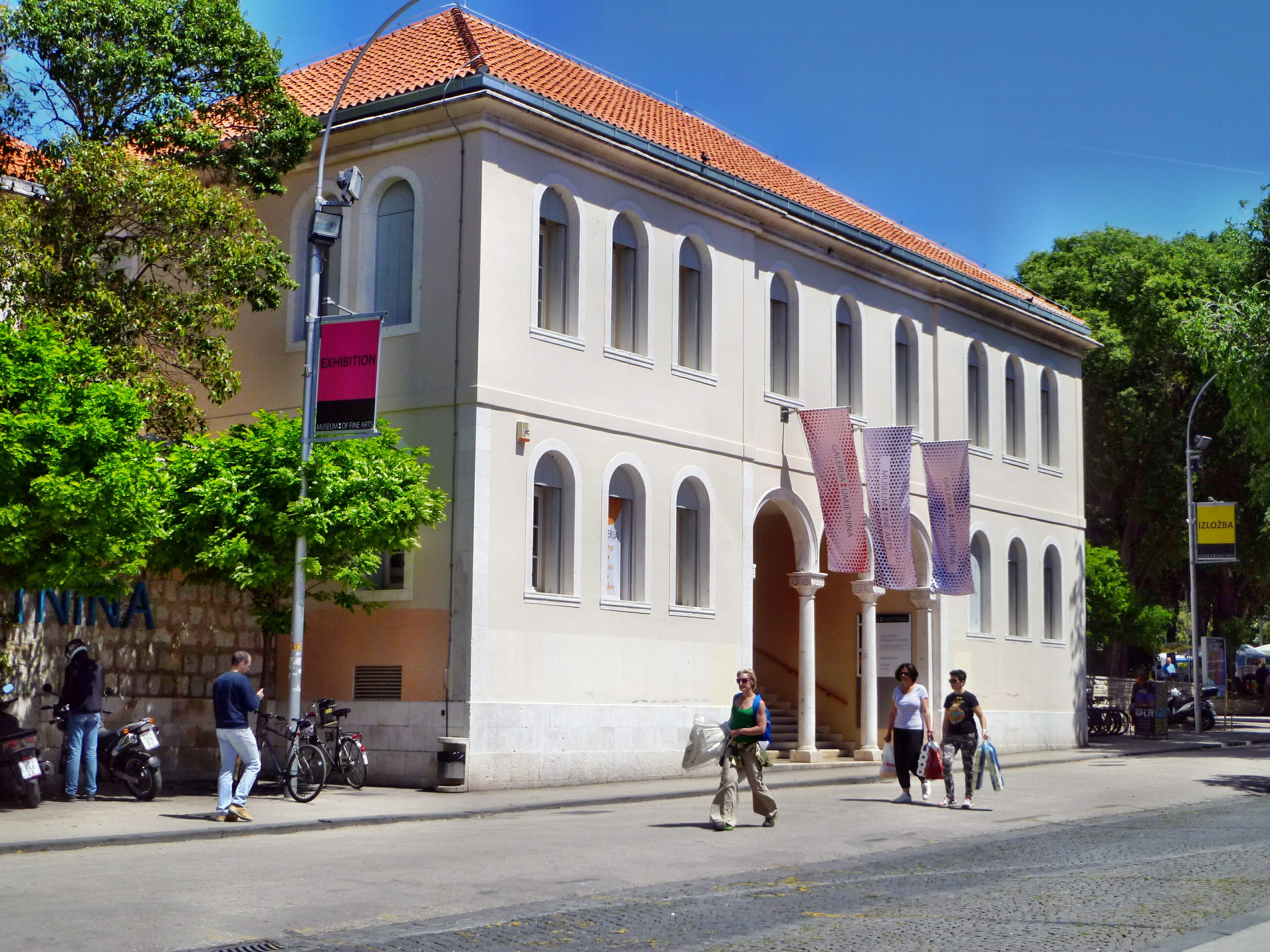
Gallery of Fine Arts

The Split Archaeological Museum (Croatian: Arheološki muzej) main collection is housed at Zrinsko-Frankopanska 25 in Split. There is also a branch building in Solin (Salona and Tusculum Collection) and two regional centres at Vid near Metković (Narona Collection), and on the island of Vis (Issa Collection). The Split Archaeological Museum is the oldest museum institution in Croatia, founded in 1820 by the decree of the Dalmatian government in Zadar. Some 150,000 artifacts cover prehistoric times, the period of Greek colonization of the Adriatic, Roman Provincial and Early Christian era to the early Middle Ages and the period of Croatian popular rulers. Of special interest is the collection of stone inscriptions from Salona and the collections of Graeco-Hellenistic ceramic objects, Roman glass, ancient clay lamps, bone and metal articles, as well as the collection of gems. In addition, the museum houses an extensive collection of ancient and medieval coins, a submarine archaeological collection, and a rich archive library.

The Museum of Croatian Archaeological Monuments (Croatian: Muzej hrvatskih arheoloških spomenika) is the only museum in Croatia dedicated to researching and presenting cultural artifacts of the Croats in the Middle Ages, between the 7th and 15th centuries, particularly the time of the early medieval Croatian state from 9th to 12th century. The collection of early medieval wicker, clay figurines, and old Croatian Latin epigraphic monuments is the largest collection of its kind in Europe.

The Split City Museum (Croatian: Muzej Grada Splita) at Papalićeva 1, is housed in the former Papalić Palace. The collection presents the urban, cultural, artistic and economic heritage of the city. The museum is also home to the Emanuel Vidović Gallery, dedicated to the most important Split painter of the 20th century.

The Ethnographical Museum (Croatian: Etnografski muzej) at Severova 1, has a wide range of ethnographic content mainly from Dalmatia. Founded in 1910, the museum collects original and contemporary applications of traditional heritage. They also track contemporary popular culture living with traces of old foundations and preserve and promote the value of folk heritage, renewing them and presenting exhibitions.

The Croatian Maritime Museum (Croatian: Hrvatski pomorski muzej) at Glagoljaška 18 – Tvrđava Gripe has a collection of marine equipment and supplies, weapons and navigation equipment, medals, ship models, uniforms and equipment, and related artwork. A permanent exhibition is planned to complete the presentation of military maritime and naval history, with a presentation that covers the period from the arrival of the Slavs to the present day.

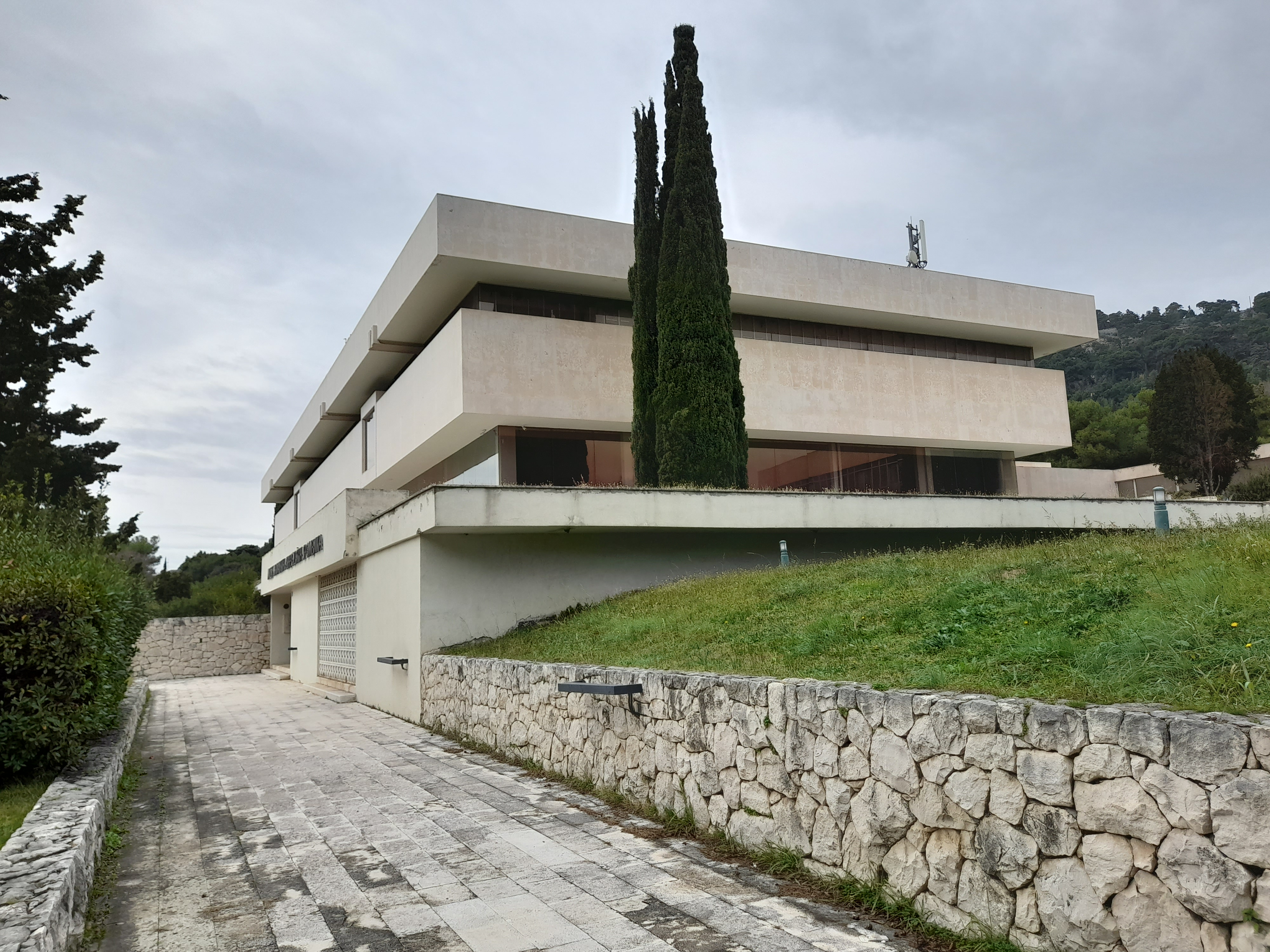
Museum of Croatian Archaeological Monuments

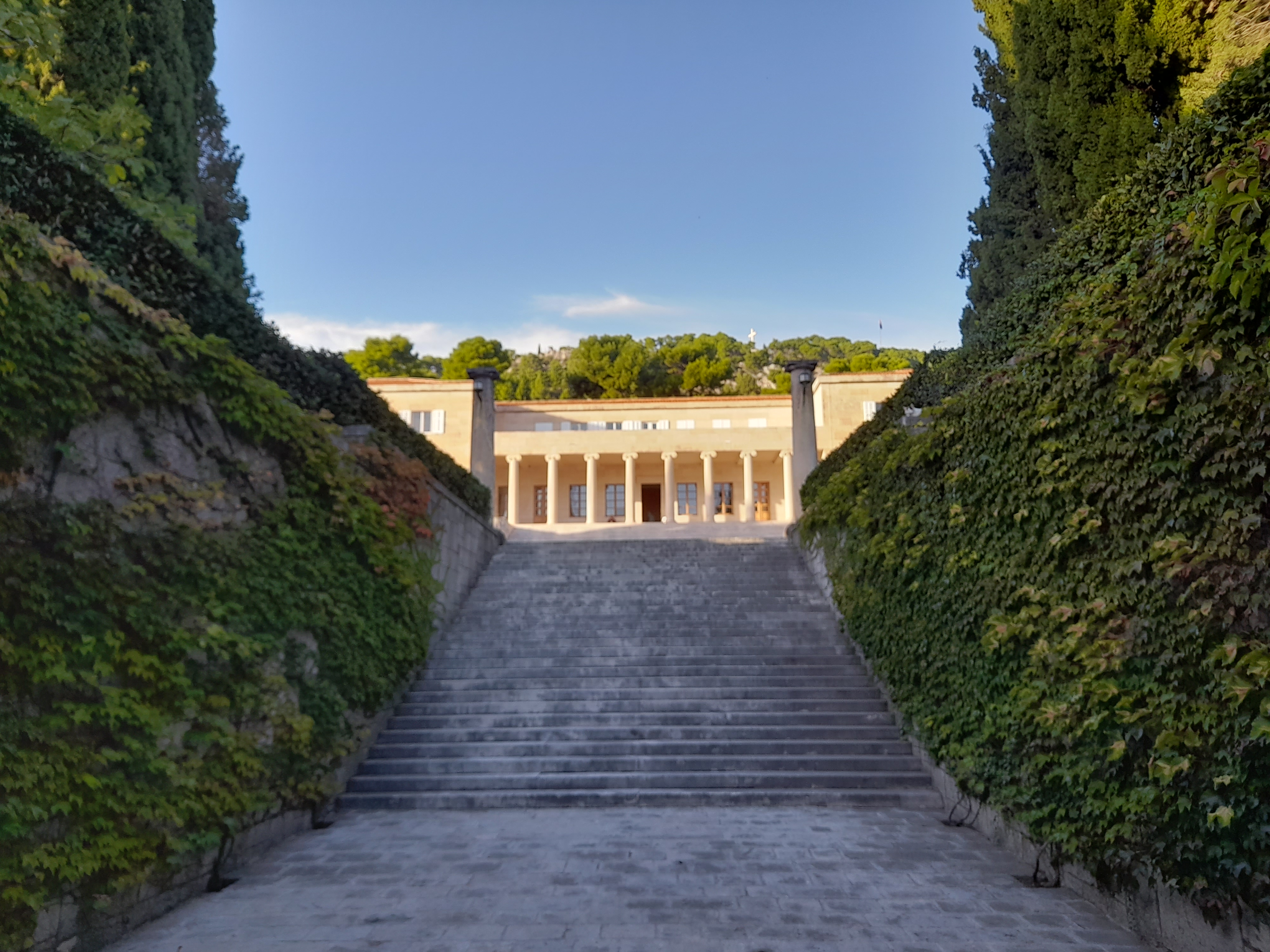
Ivan Meštrović Gallery

The Split Science Museum and Zoo (Croatian: Prirodoslovni muzej i zoološki vrt) located at Kolombatovićevo šetalište 2 on the Marjan peninsula.

The Gallery of Fine Arts (Croatian: Galerija umjetnina), located at Kralja Tomislava 15, is an art museum that contains works from the 14th century to the present day providing an overview of the artistic developments in the local art scene. The gallery was founded in 1931, and has a permanent exhibition of paintings and sculptures that includes works by major Croatian artists such as Vlaho Bukovac, Mato Celestin Medović, Branislav Dešković, Ivan Meštrović, Emanuel Vidović and Ignjat Job. The gallery also has an extensive collection of icons, and holds special exhibits of works by contemporary artists. In May 2009, the gallery opened its new premises in the old Split Hospital building behind Diocletian's Palace.

The Ivan Meštrović Gallery (Croatian: Galerija Meštrović), on the Marjan peninsula is an art museum dedicated to the work of the 20th-century sculptor, Ivan Meštrović. The gallery displays some of his most significant work, and the building itself is an art monument. The permanent collection includes works of sculpture, drawings, design, furniture and architecture. The gallery building and grounds were based on original plans by Meštrović himself, and included living and working areas, as well as exhibition spaces. Not far from the Gallery lies Kaštelet-Crikvine, a restored chapel that houses a set of wooden wall panels carved by Ivan Meštrović.

Other notable artists from Split include Oskar Herman, Tina Morpurgo, Emanuel Vidović, and Paško Vučetić.

== Culture ==
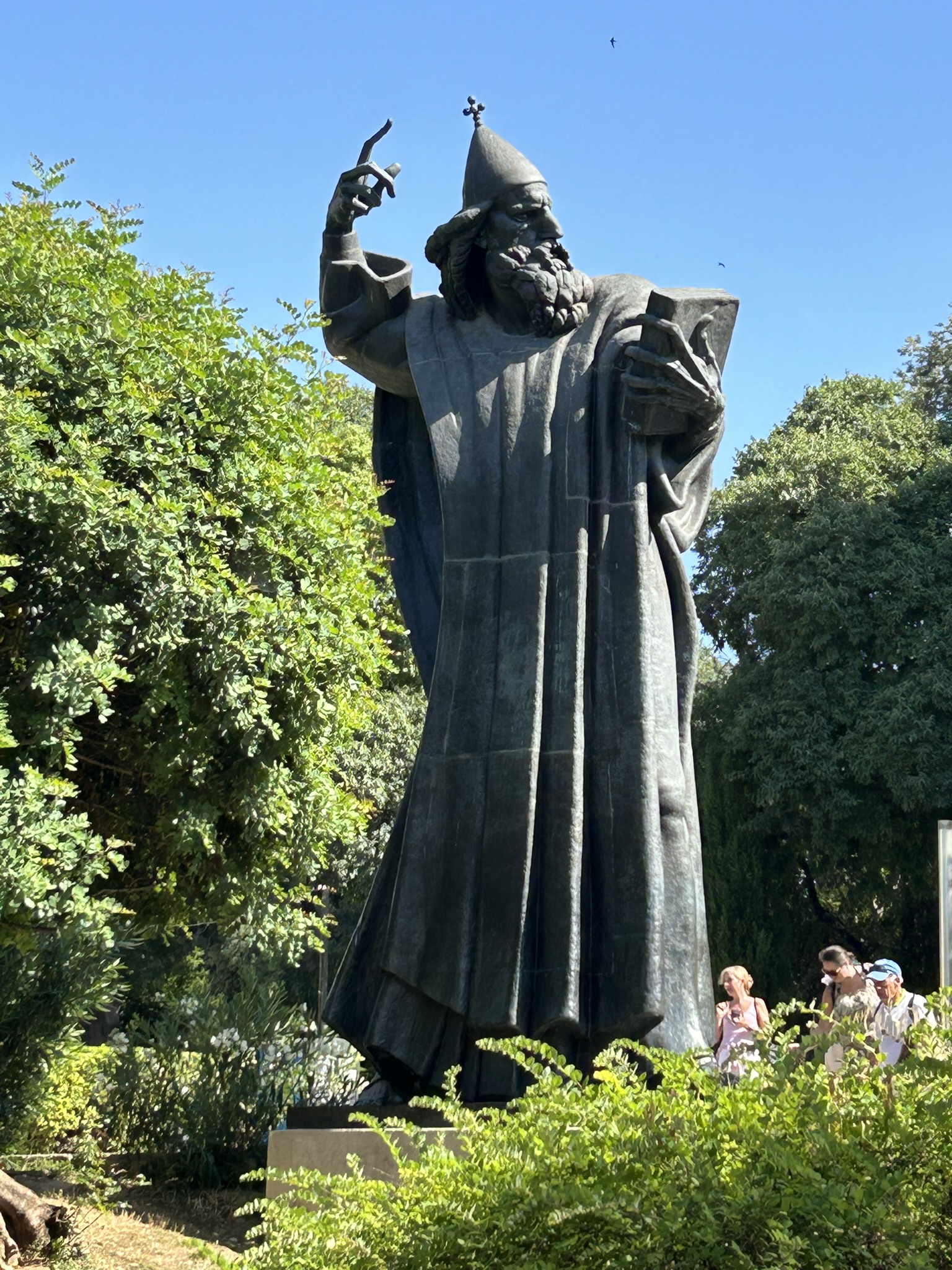
Grgur Ninski by Croatian sculptor from Split Ivan Meštrović

Split is one of the most culturally vibrant cities on the Adriatic coast, shaped by a long history that blends ancient Roman heritage, Mediterranean traditions, and modern Croatian identity. Its cultural landscape reflects centuries of continuity, adaptation, and local pride. In 1979, the historic center of Split was included into the UNESCO list of World Heritage Sites. Split is said to be one of the centres of Croatian culture. Its literary tradition can be traced to medieval times and includes names like Marko Marulić, while in more modern times more authors have a sense of humor.

Split hosts numerous cultural events throughout the year, particularly during the summer tourist season. The most notable is the Split Summer Festival, which features theater, opera, and concerts staged in historic locations such as the Peristyle. Other events include religious celebrations like the feast of Saint Domnius (Sveti Duje), the city's patron saint. This festival combines processions, music, and public gatherings, reflecting the blend of religious and civic identity. There is great cultural activity during summers, when the prestigious Split Music Festival is held.

=== Cinema ===
Among the most notable are Miljenko Smoje, with his TV series Malo misto and Velo misto (the latter covering Split's modernization), and Ivo Tijardović, who wrote an operetta called "Little Floramye" (Croatian: Mala Floramye). Both represented to some the old traditions slowly dying out due to large numbers of rural migrants from the undeveloped hinterland.

Despite colorful settings and characters, as well as a cinema tradition beginning with early 20th-century works of Josip Karaman, there were relatively few films shot in or around Split. Its most notable star is Boris Dvornik.

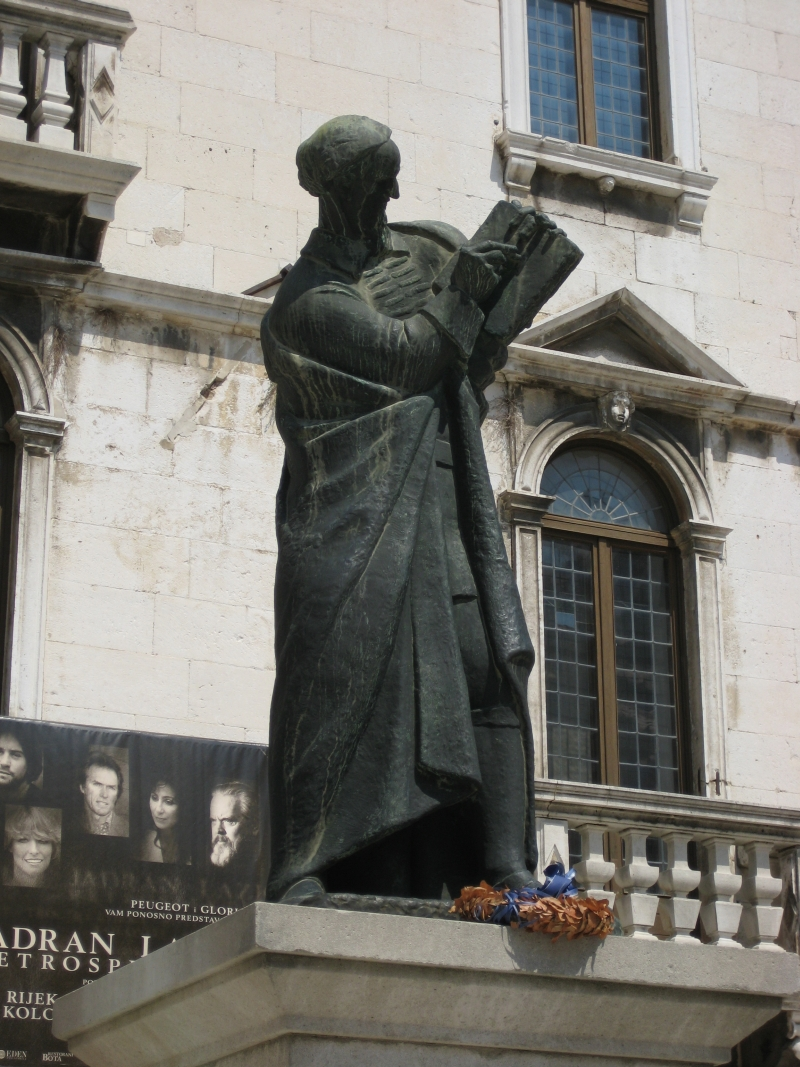
Monument to Croatian poet from 15th century Marko Marulić

=== Music and poetry ===
One of the most recognisable aspects of Split culture is popular music. Notable composers include Giulio Bajamonti, Franz von Suppé, Josip Hatze, Jakov Gotovac, Ivo Tijardović, Ruben Radica, Zdenko Runjić, Tonči Huljić – some of the most influential musicians in former Habsburg Empire, former Yugoslavia, and contemporary Croatia.

Also, the more notable musicians and bands from Split are Oliver Dragojević, Gibonni, Daleka Obala, Magazin, Severina, Dino Dvornik, Jasmin Stavros, Neno Belan, Goran Karan, Dražen Zečić, Doris Dragović, Jelena Rozga, Tutti Frutti, Siniša Vuco, Meri Cetinić and guitar player Petar Čulić. Split also developed a prominent hip hop scene, with notable acts such as The Beat Fleet, Dječaci, Grše, Kiša Metaka and ST!llness.

Music plays a central role in Split's culture. Traditional Dalmatian "klapa" singing—characterized by a cappella harmonies—is widely recognized and celebrated. Modern Croatian pop and rock music also have strong roots in the city. In 2012 klapa was inscribed in UNESCO Intangible Cultural Heritage of Humanity.

== Education ==
The Illyrian Academy was a historical academy established in Split in the early 1700s at the time it was part of the Republic of Venice. The Classical Gymnasium in Split likewise traced its roots to the same period.

There are 24 primary schools and 23 secondary schools including 11 grammar schools. The secondary schools in the city include:

- I Gymnasium Split
- II Gymnasium Split
- III Gymnasium Split

=== University ===
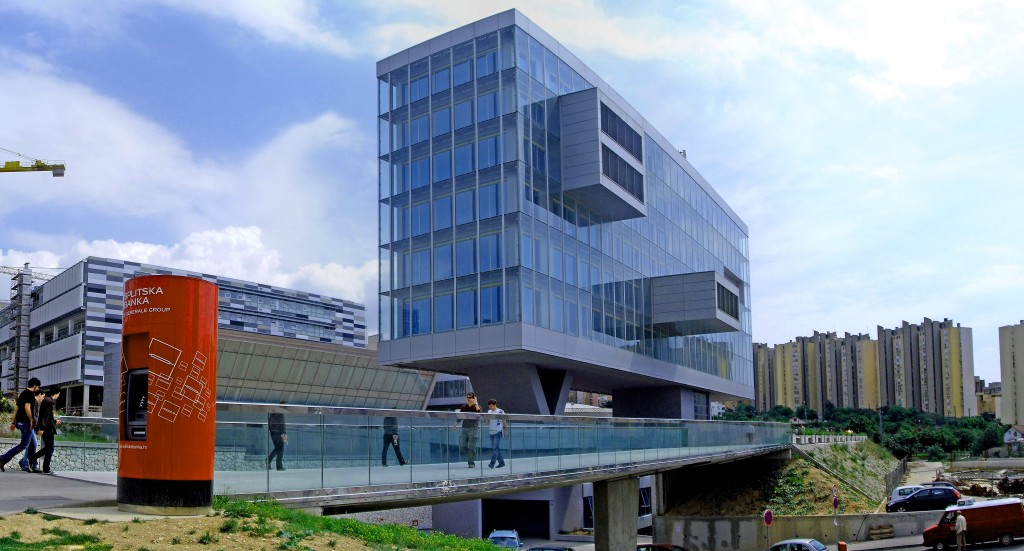
Split University Library

The University of Split (Croatian: Sveučilište u Splitu) was founded in 1974. In the last few years it has grown to a large extent. Now it has 18,000 students and is organized in 12 faculties and 1 Academy (Arts Academy – Theatre department, Music department, Fine arts department and design). Split has the biggest university campus in Croatia with all the facilities. It houses all of the faculties, a large student centre with a sports hall, sporting grounds and a university library.

== Sport and recreation ==
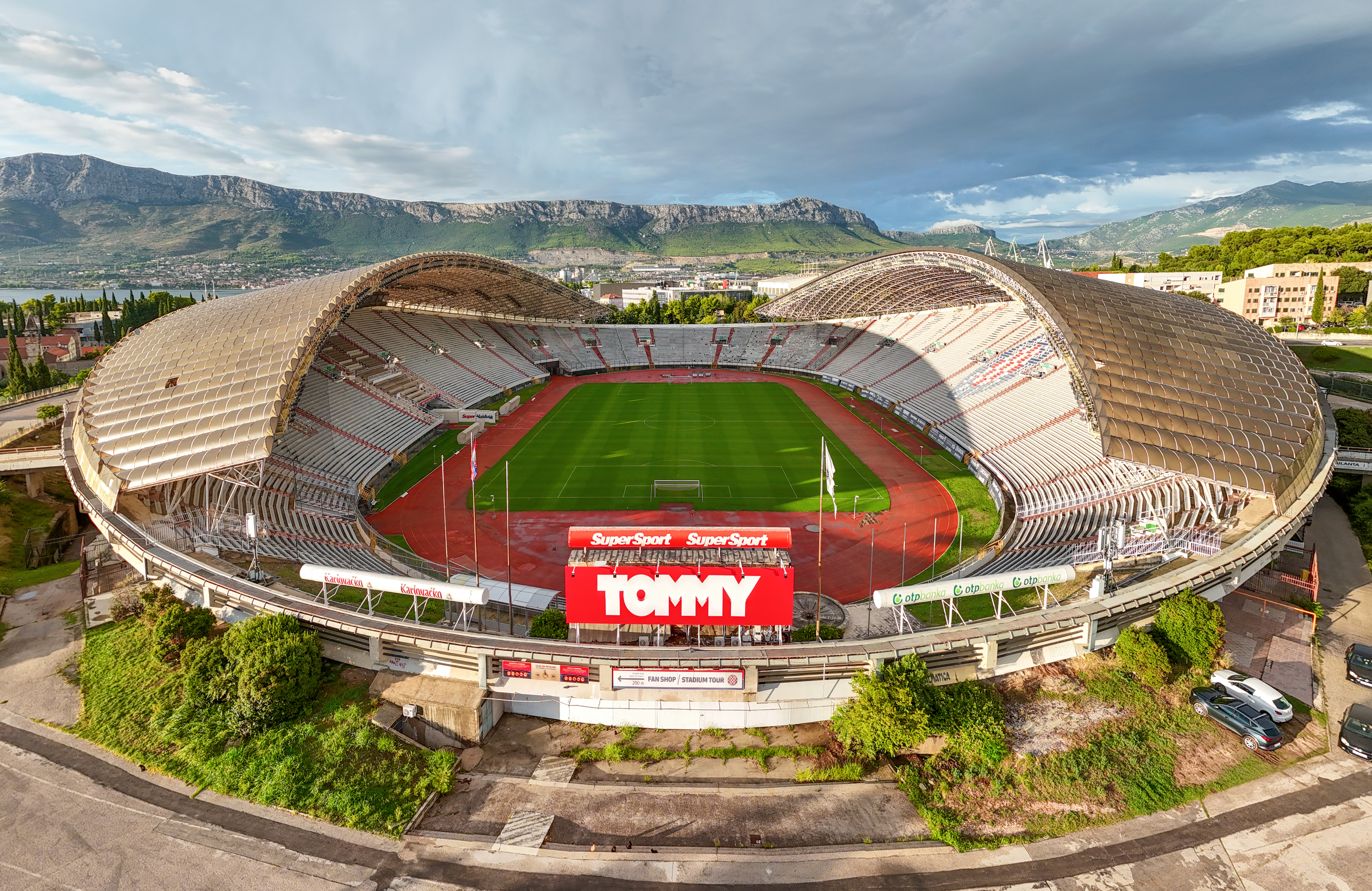
Poljud Stadium, commissioned for the 1979 Mediterranean Games

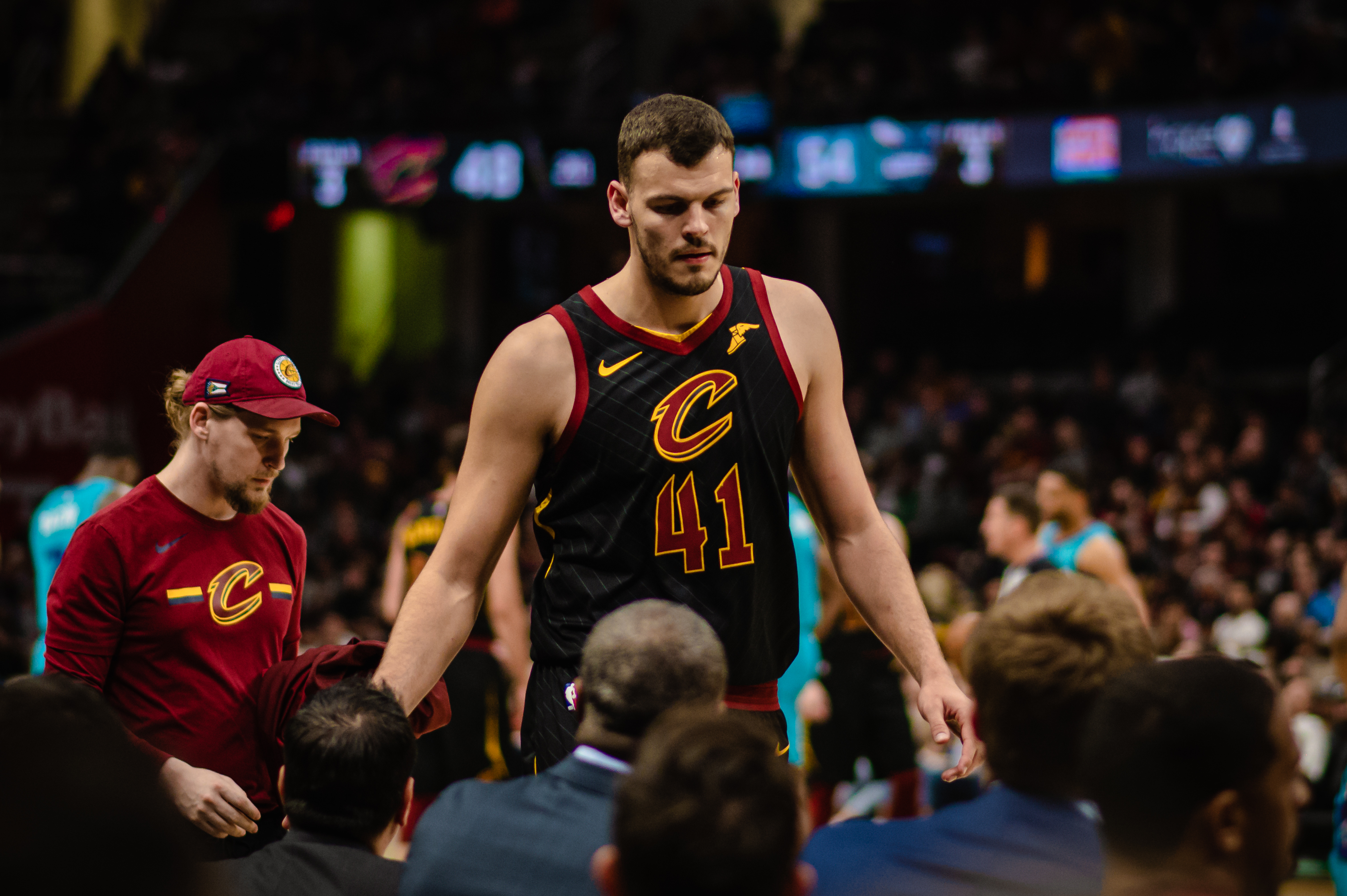
Ante Žižić, who has played in the NBA, is from Split

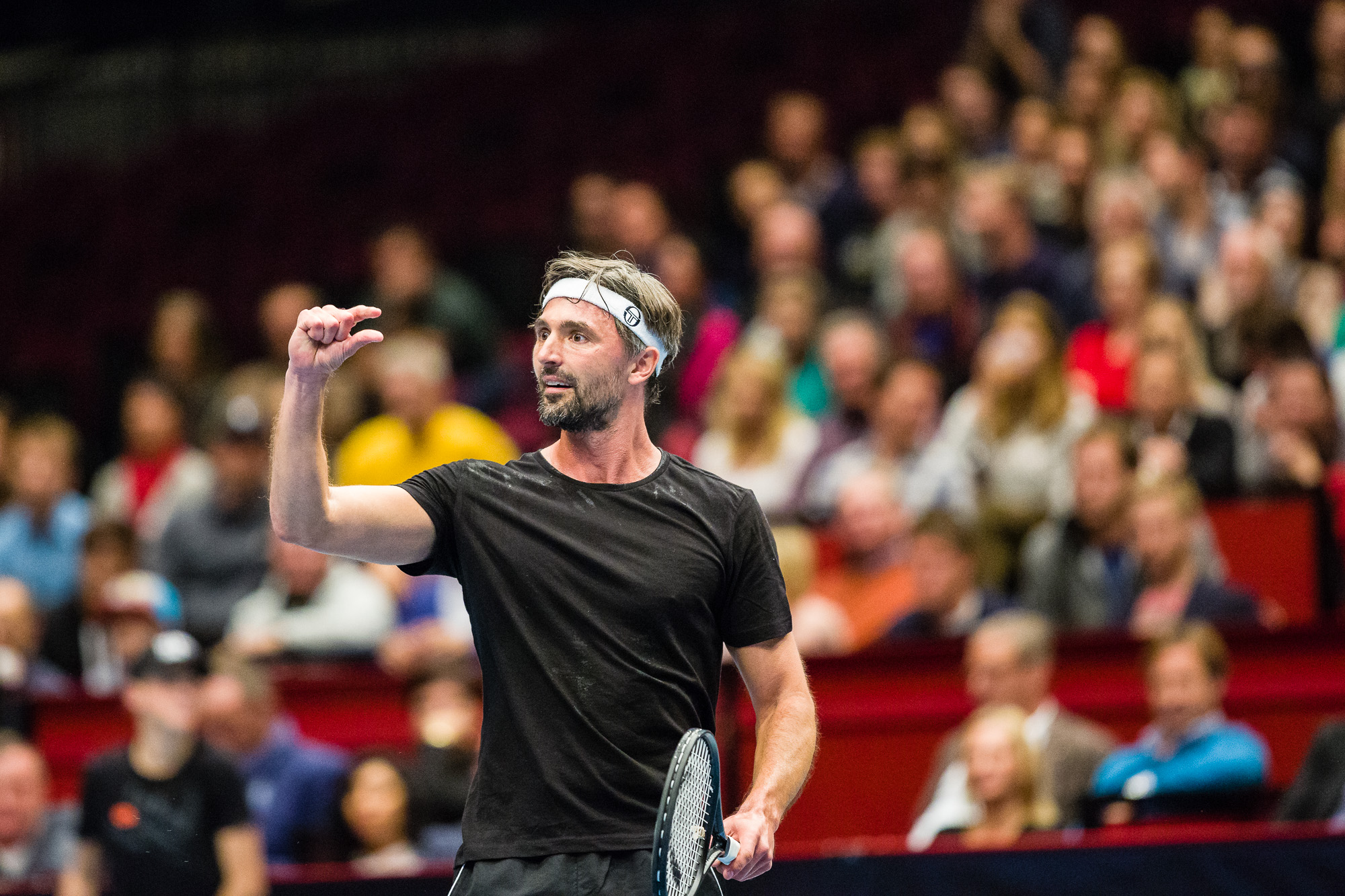
Professional tennis player Goran Ivanišević, winner of 2001 Wimbledon

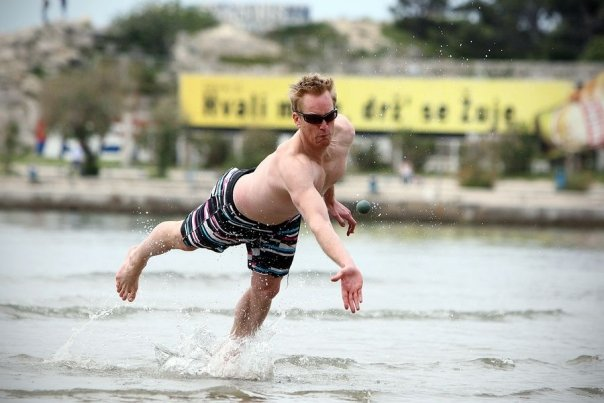
Split's traditional sport "Picigin"

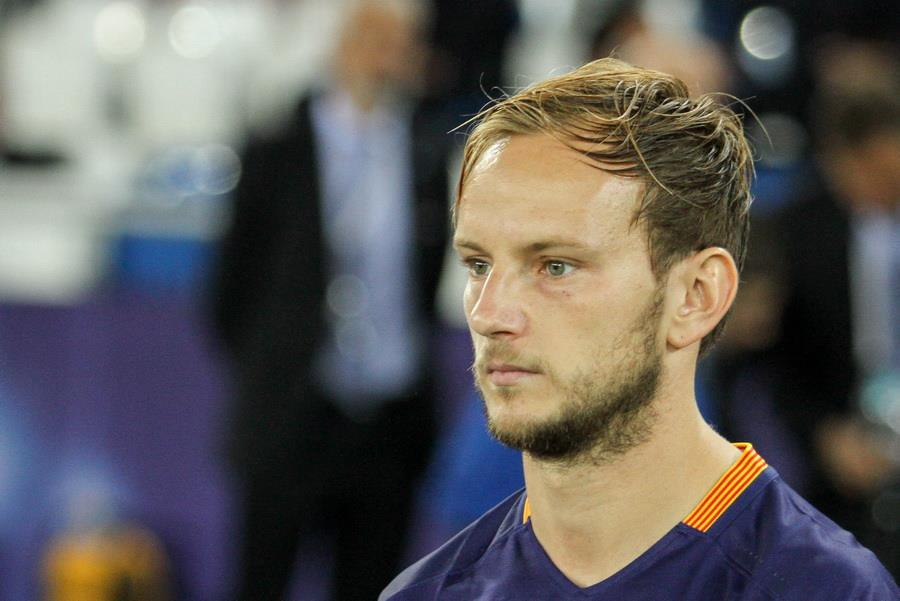
Ivan Rakitić, Croatian football player who plays for HNK Hajduk Split

Sportsmen are traditionally held in high regard in Split, which has produced many champions. The most popular sports in Split are association football, tennis, basketball, swimming, rowing, sailing, waterpolo, athletics, and handball. Residents of Split prefer to call their city as "the sportiest city in the world". The first sports club in Split was founded in 1877 under the name "Societa Bersaglio" (Shooting Society). Shooting was revived in 1925. The Falcon Society "Hrvatski sokol" was founded in 1893 and played a major role in the affirmation of Split sports. The Croatian football club "Hajduk" was also founded in 1911, as the first Croatian football club in Dalmatia. Split was host of the 1979 Mediterranean Games, 1990 European Athletics Championships and 2010 IAAF Continental Cup, as well as co-host of the 2009 World Handball Championship and the 2018 European Handball Championship.

=== Ball sports ===
==== Football ====
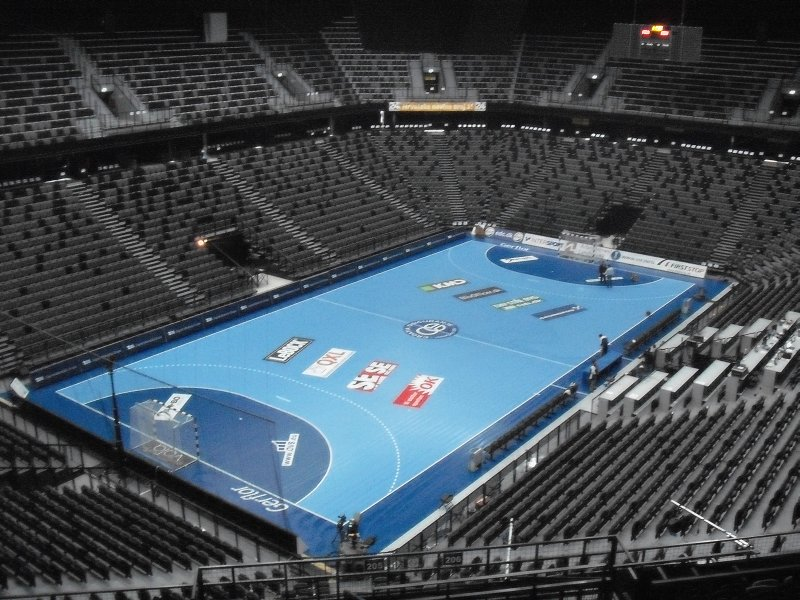
Spaladium Arena

The main football club is HNK Hajduk Split, one of the most popular clubs in Croatia supported by a large fan association known as Torcida Split, while RNK Split is the city's second club. Torcida Split is the oldest fan group in Europe estimated 1950. The largest football stadium is the Poljud Stadium (Hajduk's ground), with around 35,000 capacity (55,000 prior to the renovation to an all-seater). Slaven Bilić, Aljoša Asanović, Igor Tudor, Robert Jarni, and Stipe Pletikosa are some of the natives who started their careers at Hajduk. Together with Poljud Stadium, Split also has an indoor sports and entertainment arena Spaladium Arena build for 2009 World Men's Handball Championship, which was held in Croatia. Spaladium Arena held events and concerts for popular regional musicians like Severina, Jelena Rozga, Bijelo Dugme, Parni Valjak, Nina Badrić, Željko Joksimović, Maya Berović, and international mainstream artists like Iron Maiden, Guns N' Roses, The Cult, Zucchero, Simple Minds.

==== Basketball ====
Basketball is also popular, and the city basketball club, KK Split, holds the record of winning the EuroLeague three consecutive times (1989–1991), with notable players like Toni Kukoč and Dino Rađa, both of whom are Split natives, as well as coach Ante Grgurević.

==== Handball ====
Ivano Balić, two-time IHF World Player of the Year was Split's best handball player. Split was co-host of the 2009 World Handball Championship and the 2018 European Handball Championship.

==== Tennis ====
Split's notable tennis players are the retired 2001 Wimbledon champion Goran Ivanišević, Mario Ančić (Super Mario), multiple Davis Cup winner Nikola Pilić and Željko Franulović. Marina Eraković was also born in Split.

Since 2021, Firule Tennis Centre hosts Split Open, international wheelchair tennis tournament in April.

==== Rugby ====
RK Nada were the pioneers of rugby union in this part of the world. They were by far the strongest club in the former Yugoslavia and they are also by far the most successful club in modern-day Croatia.

==== Baseball ====
Baseball in Split is one of the city's longest sporting traditions. Although the sport began semi-officially in December 1918 when a group of US sailors from a ship in port introduced the game to some young Croats, it was not until 1972 when a pair of teachers at a local school formed the Salona Baseball Club, named after the ancient Roman city of Salona. The first actual game played in Split was on 9 September 1978 between Split (the new team moved here and was called Nada) and Jezice from Ljubljana, a 20–1 romp for the locals. A schedule of games began in earnest and by 1980 there were regular league games. The next major milestone was in 1983 when the International Baseball Federation (IBAF) accepted Yugoslavia as an official member. The Croatian National Baseball Federation was established in 1989.

A major contribution to the development of baseball in Split was made by the commander of the Allied Navy from the ship Olympia, American Admiral Philip Andrews; he helped by donating sports equipment to newly established baseball clubs, or sections, in Split, Omiš, Sinj and Imotski via the Y.M.C.A..

Today, the Croatia national baseball team is mostly consisted of players of the Split's Nada team. Split's team, Nada, plays its home games at the old Hajduk stadium, where the rugby club also plays. Without a mound, it is not a regulation field. The team's main rival is Zagreb and there are teams from half a dozen other cities around the country. In addition to playing other Croatian teams, inter-league games are played in neighbouring countries. Although not a professional team or league, some player/coaches are paid.

=== Water sports ===
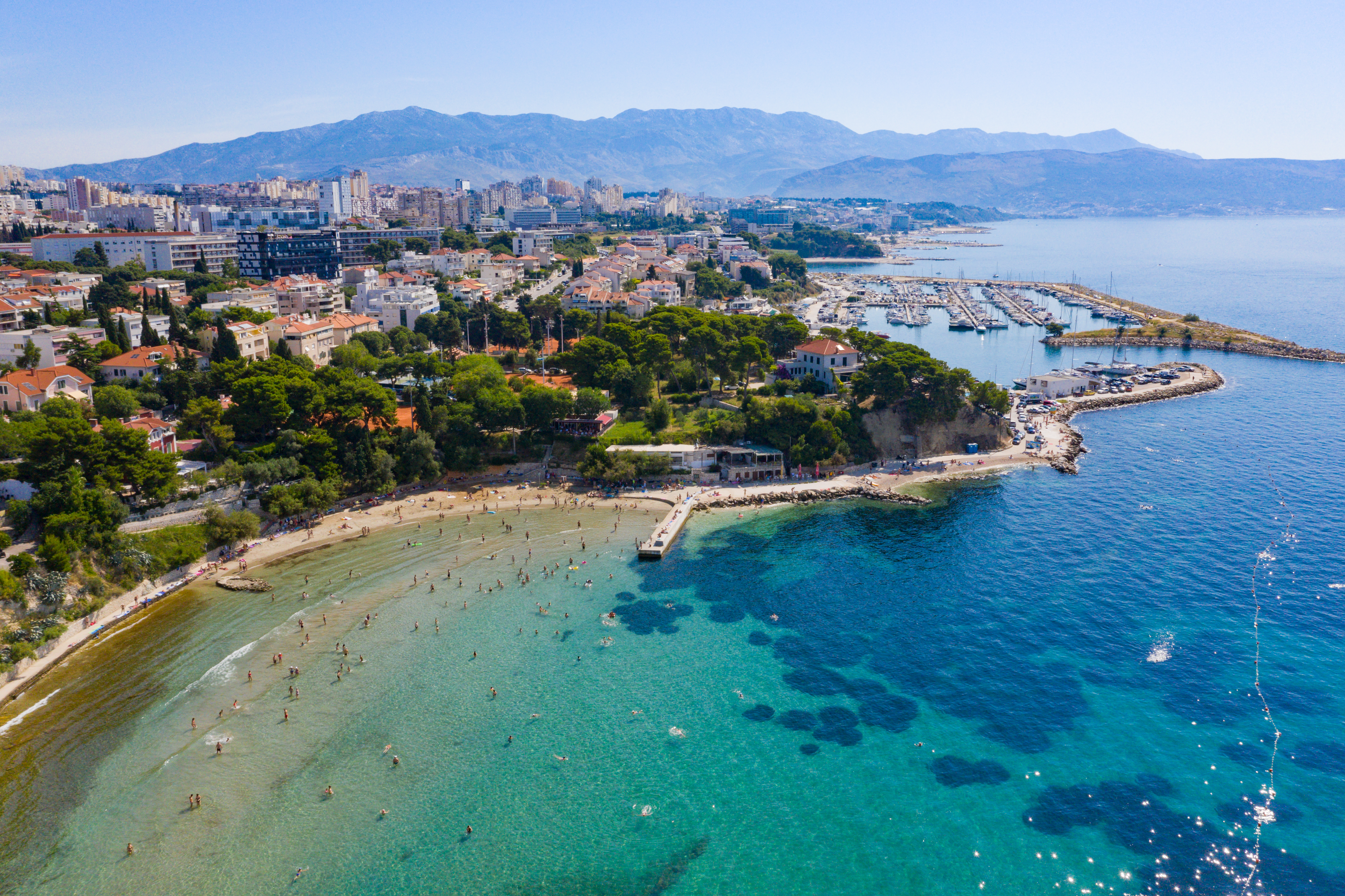
Firule Beach, most notable beach in Split

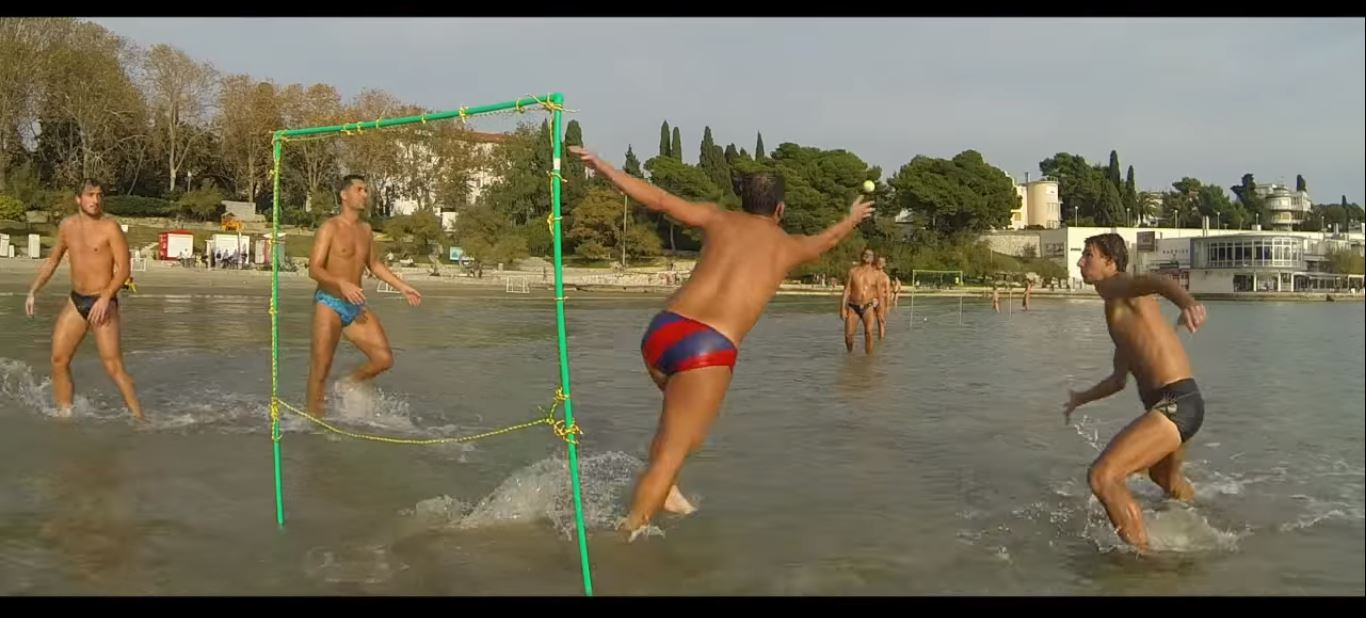
Picigin

==== Picigin ====
Picigin is a traditional local sport (originating in 1908), played on the sandy Bačvice beach. It is played in very shallow water (just ankle-deep) with a small ball. Picigin is played by five players. The ball is the peeled tennis ball. There is a tradition of playing picigin in Split on New Year's Day, regardless of the weather conditions, in spite of the sea temperature rarely exceeding 15 °C (59 °F).

==== Swimming ====
Swimming also has a long tradition in Split, with Đurđica Bjedov (1968 Olympic gold medal and Olympic record in the 100 m breaststroke), Duje Draganja (2004 Olympic silver medal) and Vanja Rogulj as the city's top swimmers.

==== Rowing ====
Members of the local rowing club HVK Gusar won numerous Olympic and World Championship medals.

==== Water Polo ====
Split used to be the home to three top-level water polo clubs, the winners of many domestic and international titles: Jadran (twice LEN Champions League winner), Mornar (LEN Cup Winners' Cup winner) and now defunct POŠK (one LEN Champions League, one LEN Super Cup and two times LEN Cup Winners' Cup winner). Many players from Split have participated at the Olympic Games, World, and European Championships, both for Croatia and Yugoslavia, having won several medals. Several water polo players from Split have been considered the best in the world during their careers: Ratko Rudić, Damir Polić, Milivoj Bebić, and Deni Lušić.

=== Athletics ===
As a member of the ASK Split athletics club, the champion high jumper Blanka Vlašić also originates from the city. Famous members of the ASK are/were sprinters Josip Alebić and Ðani Kovač, shot putter Filip Mihaljević, discus thrower Marija Tolj and high jumper Biljana Petrović.

Stadium Poljud was host of the 2010 IAAF Continental Cup.

=== Other sports ===
Former WWE wrestler and WWE Hall of Fame member Josip Peruzović, better known as Nikolai Volkoff, was born in Split.

The Split SeaWolves club is the only American football team in Dalmatia. Active from 2008, they are currently still developing and the main focus is on a flag football team.

In mountaineering, the local chapter of the HPS is HPD "Mosor", founded in 1926, had 283 members in 1936 under the Umberto Girometta presidency, being one of the largest in the society at the time. Membership rose to 344 in 1937, but fell to 301 in 1938.

== Nightlife ==
Split has an active music scene with various venues and events, including the Split Festival and numerous clubs and bars with live music, particularly during the summer.

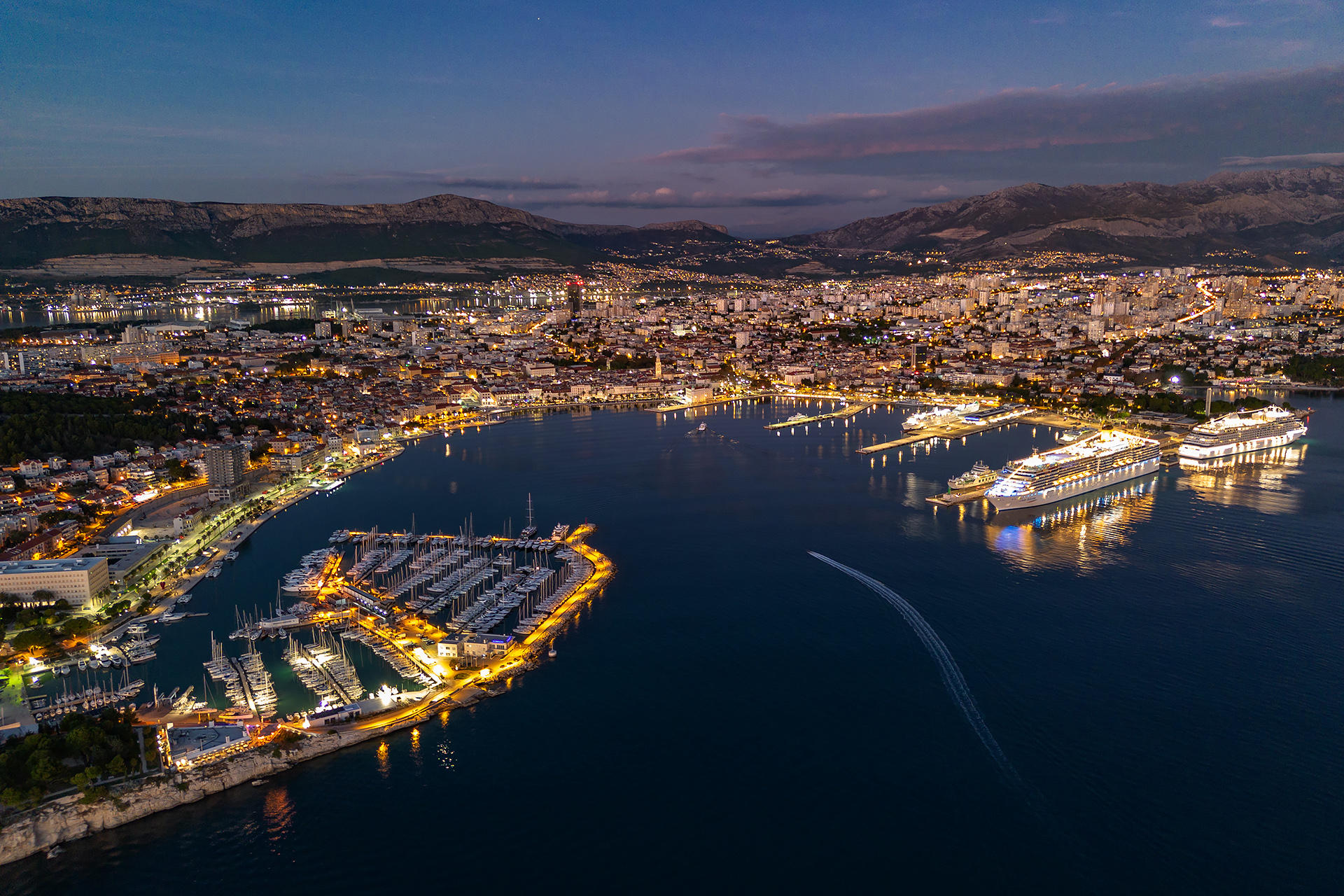
Split promenade at night

British Travel vlog and magazine "Gap360" named Split 6th best party destination in Europe, alongside Berlin, Mykonos, Amsterdam, Ibiza. Since 2013, Split was a host city for American electronic festival Ultra Music Festival and its division for Europe – Ultra Europe. In addition to its main stage and event – which was held on Poljud Stadium (until 2019), the Ultra Europe also holds party events on Croatian islands of Brač, Hvar and Vis. Ever since its opening, the city of Split welcomed more than 200,000 people annually. The Ultra Europe Festival in Split has been visited by 1,3 million visitors over the past ten years, including people from around forty countries around the world, including the countries of the European Neighborhood, like Poland, Germany, Slovakia, Russia and Czech Republic.

In addition to its main music festival, Split offers discotheques and night clubs amongst the City Center or on the beaches. A more traditional Croatian nightlife experience, accompanied by traditional Croatian traditional, pop music, klape and recently rap, dance and trap music.

== Transportation ==
Split is an important transport center for Dalmatia and the wider region. In addition to the Zagreb-Split freeway (A1), the traffic along the Adriatic coast on the Adriatic Highway from Rijeka to Dubrovnik flows through the city. The local public transport company Promet Split runs bus lines in the city and into the surroundings. There is no tram since the city is unsuitable for it due to its hilly geography.

=== Split Airport ===
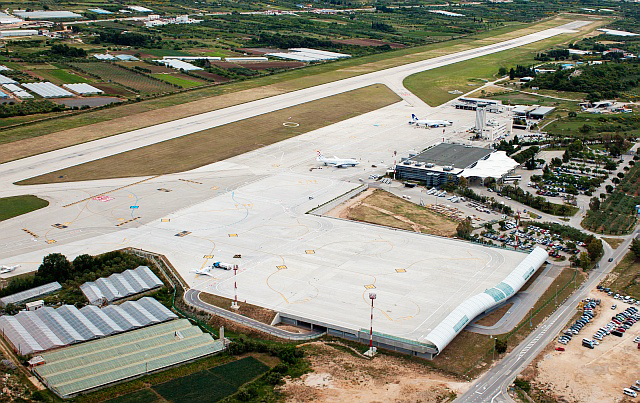
Split Airport

The Split Airport in Kaštela, located about 20 km outside of Split, is the second largest in Croatia in terms of passenger numbers (3,88 million in 2025). It has services to national and some European destinations year-round and sees lots of additional seasonal connections in the summer. The airport was designed by Ivan Vulić and it features modern passenger terminals with shops, cafés, car rental services, and public transportation links, including buses and taxis, and it plays a vital role in Croatia's tourism industry by accommodating a high volume of charter and low-cost flights such as easyJet, Volotea, Wizz Air and Jet2.com. In 2026, it was announced that Split Airport will be connected for the first time with North American airline United Airline which will connect Split Airport with Newark Airport which serves New York City.

=== Port of Split ===
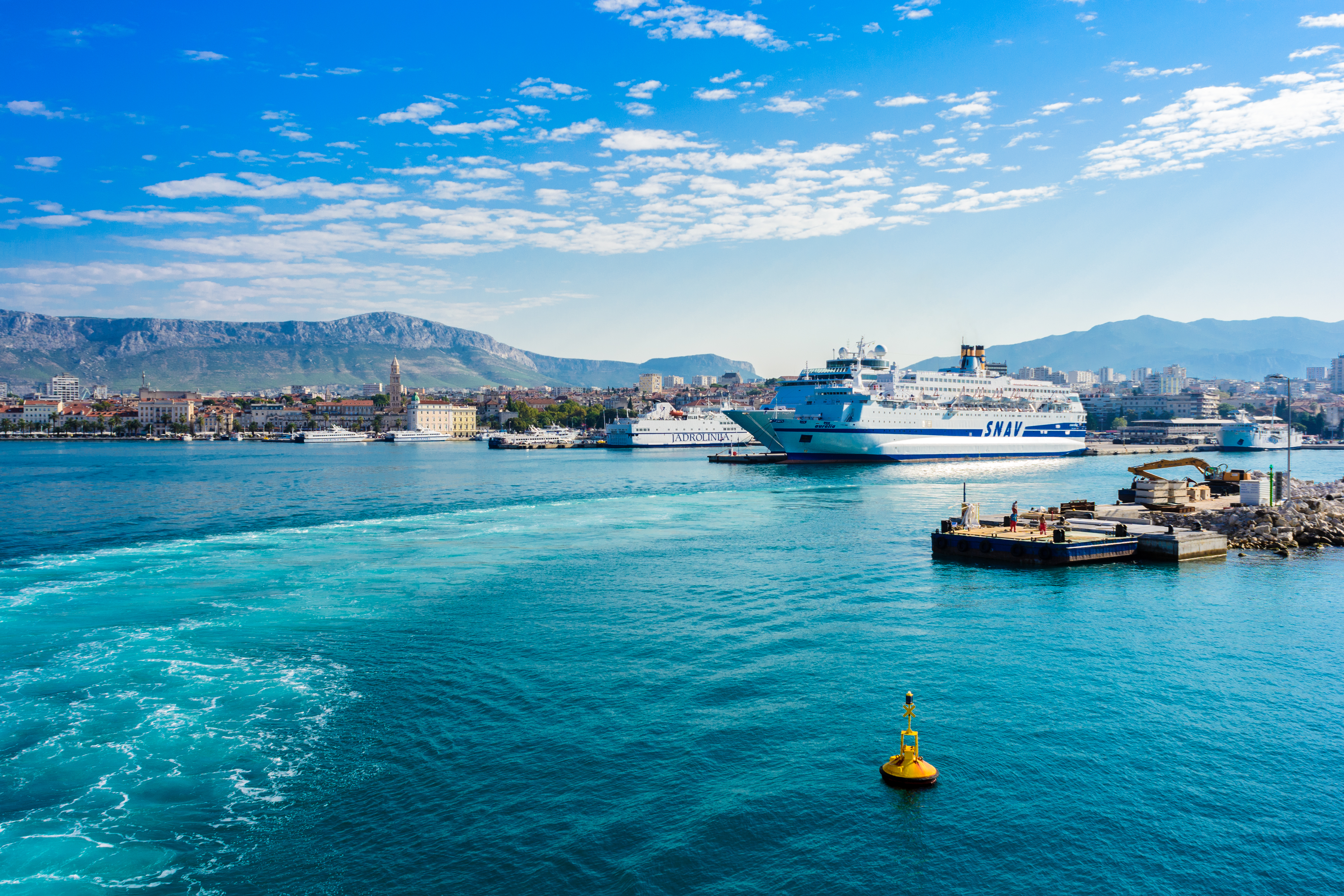
Port of Split

The Port of Split, which serves 5 million passengers every year, and a record 5,8 million in 2023, making it third busiest port in the Mediterranean. It connects Split to the nearby central Dalmatian islands Brač, Hvar and Šolta, as well as the more distant Vis, Korčula, Mljet and Lastovo, most prominently by Croatian ferry Jadrolinija. There are also routes to Rijeka, Dubrovnik, and Ancona in Italy and additional seasonal routes to further destinations in Italy. Split is also becoming a major cruise ship destination, with over 260 ship visits, carrying 130,000 passengers.

=== Split railway ===
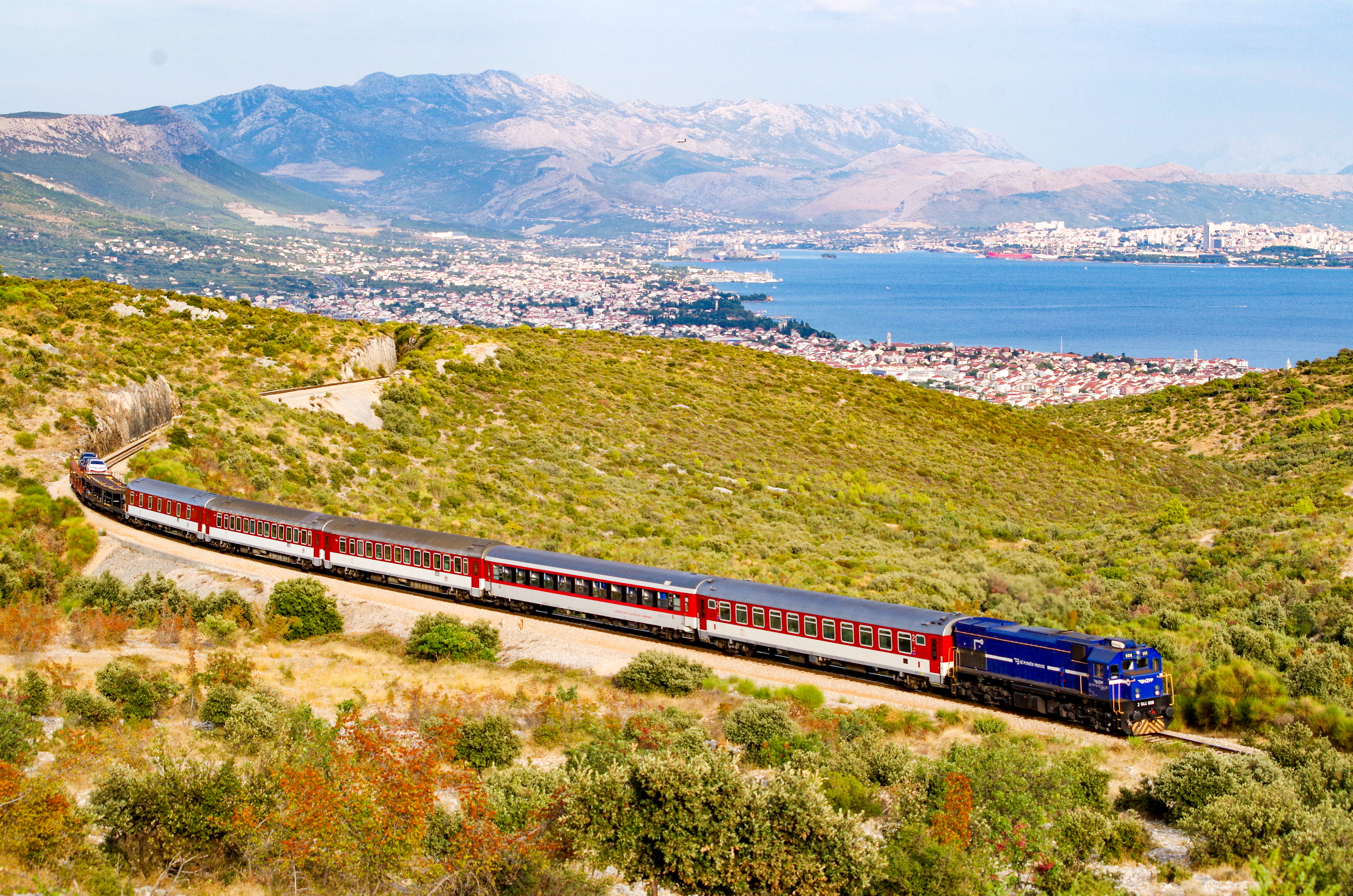
ÖBB Train, above Kaštela, departing from Split

Split has a railway station located in the city center just near the main port (in the southern part of the peninsula), which serves as a terminus for Croatian Railways' long-distance limited-stop service trains (which run between Split and country's capital city Zagreb) and commuter trains which run between Split and Kaštel Stari as a part of Split Suburban Railway. There are also summer-seasonal limited-stop overnight trains between Split and Osijek/Vukovar (passenger service provided by Croatian Railways), Budapest (passenger service provided by MAV), Vienna/Bratislava (passenger service provided by ÖBB AND ŽSSK). Other than the terminus station, the city has one additional train station "Split Predgrađe" (lit. 'Split Suburbia') located in the part of the city called "Kopilica" (in the northern part of peninsula) which is served by both long-distance and commuter trains.

=== Buses ===
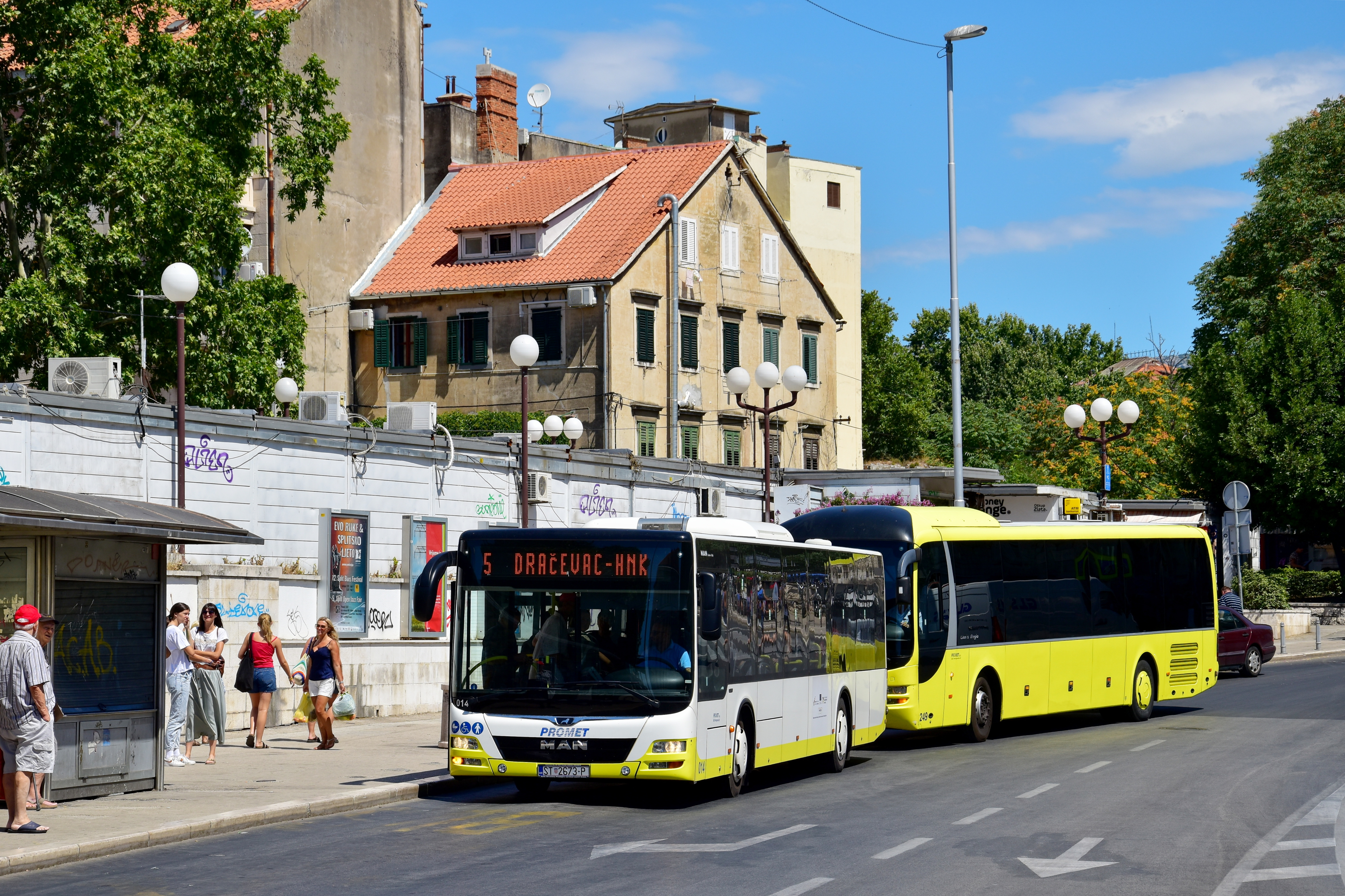
Buses, operated by Promet Split

Public transport in Split is based on a bus network operated by the company Promet Split. More than half of citizens use city bus transportation, most often to get to the city center. A slight decline in users has been observed compared to 2019. Promet Split operates the city's public bus network using a fleet of both modern, air-conditioned buses and older vehicles. The bus network is divided into four fare zones; Zone 1 covers Split, Zone 2 includes Solin, Stobreč, Podstrana, and Klis, Zone 3 serves Kaštela, Dugopolje, and Dugi Rat, while Zone 4 includes Trogir and Omiš. The most popular regional routes are Route 60 to Omiš and Route 37 to Split Airport via Trogir. Both depart from the Sukoišan bus terminal, approximately one kilometre from Split's historic city centre.

== International relations ==
=== Twin towns ===
Split is twinned with:

- Ancona, Italy
- Antofagasta, Chile
- Beit Shemesh, Israel
- Charlottenburg-Wilmersdorf (Berlin), Germany
- Cockburn, Australia
- Dover, United Kingdom
- Gladsaxe, Denmark
- Kraków, Poland
- Los Angeles, United States
- Mostar, Bosnia and Herzegovina
- Odesa, Ukraine
- Ostrava, Czech Republic
- Rzeszów, Poland
- Sarandë, Albania
- Štip, North Macedonia
- Trondheim, Norway, since 1956
- Velenje, Slovenia

=== Partnerships ===
Split is partnered with:

- Beirut, Lebanon
- Bandar Lampung, Indonesia
- Cagli, Italy
- Cetinje, Montenegro
- Iquique, Chile
- İzmir, Turkey
- Kermanshah, Iran
- Patras, Greece
- Pescara, Italy
- Punta Arenas, Chile
- Rosario, Argentina

== Notable people ==
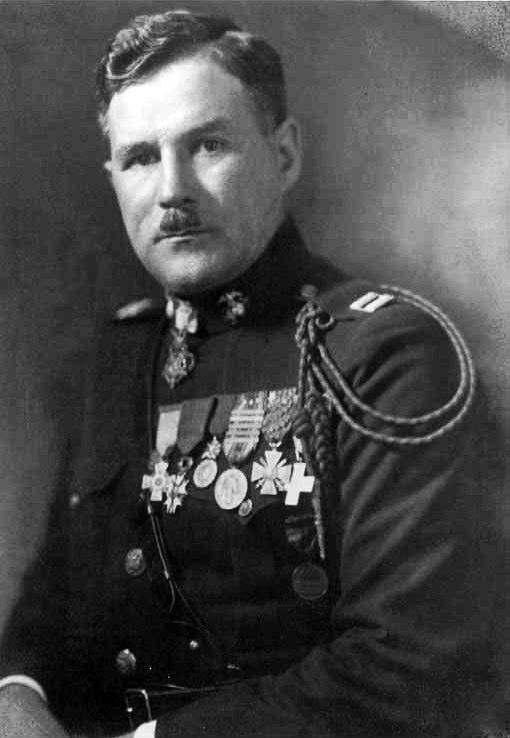
Louis Cukela, Split-born US Marine major, one of 19 two-time recipients of the Medal of Honor

- Ivo Politeo (1887–1956), lawyer.
- Louis Cukela (1888–1956), Split-born US Marine Major.
- Emanuel Vidović (1870–1953), painter
- Emil Stock (1868–1951), industrialist and businessman
- Vid Morpurgo (1838–1911), industrialist, publisher, politician and bookstore owner.
- don Frane Bulić (1846–1934), priest, archaeologist, historian
- Franz von Suppé (1819–1895), composer, father of the Viennese operetta.
- Jakov Gotovac (1895–1982), conductor and composer
- Josip Hatze (1879–1959), composer, conductor, and choirmaster
- Marko Marulić (1450–1524), writer
- Severina (born 1972), often regarded as most popular female Croatian singer.
- Jelena Rozga (born 1977), Croatian pop-folk singer.
- Mate Mišo Kovač (born 1941), one of the best selling singers of former Yugoslavia, with more than 20 million records sold.
- Magazin (formed in 1979), one of the most popular groups in former Yugoslavia, and in today's Croatia.
- Doris Dragović (born 1961), Croatian pop singer, often regarded as "Diva of Croatian Music" and "Queen of Torcida", 4th runner-up at 1999 Eurovision Song Contest.
- Oliver Dragojević (1947–2018), Croatian pop-ballad singer, songwriter and composer, one of the most popular musicians in Croatia's history and only Croatian who sold out Carnegie Hall, Royal Albert Hall, L'Olympia and Sydney Opera House.
- Zlatan Stipišić-Gibonni (born 1968), Croatian pop singer
- Slavko Sobin (born 1984), Croatian actor known for movies like; Papillion, 97 Minutes and The Zookeeper's Wife.
- Marina Fernandez (born 1981), Croatian actress.
- Boris Dvornik (1939–2008), actor, director, and screenwriter
- Dino Dvornik (1964–2006), Croatian pop singer, known as "King of Funk".
- Petar Grašo (born 1976), Croatian pop singer
- Danijela Martinović (born 1971), Croatian pop singer, 5th runner-up at 1998 Eurovision Song Contest.
- Albina Grčić (born 1999), Croatian pop singer.
- Grše (born 1995), Croatian rapper, the longest number one song on Croatia Songs on Billboard chart.
- Goran Ivanišević (born 1971), Croatian professional tennis player, winner of Wimbledon, member of International Tennis Hall of Fame
- Ludmila Janovská (1907 – after 1962), Czech painter
- Ivan Perišić (born 1989), Croatian professional footballer, Croatia national football team.
- Marko Livaja (born 1993), Croatian football player, Hajduk Split.
- Ante Rebić (born 1993), Croatian professional footballer.
- Toni Kukoč (born 1968), former Croatian-American professional basketball player.
- Slaven Bilić (born 1968), Croatian formal football player and current coach.
- Ivano Balić (born 1979), former Croatian handball player.
- Stipe Pletikosa (born 1979), former professional Croatian goalkeeper.
- Antonio Plazibat (born 1993), Croatian professional kickboxer
- Bosiljka Schedlich (born 1948), Croatian-German peace activist
- Ante Žižić (born 1997), professional basketball player.

== See also ==
- Dalmatia
- Diocletian's Palace
- List of ancient cities in Illyria
- Split-Dalmatia County
- Church of Holy Trinity, Split
- Stato da Màr

== Sources ==
- Novak, Grga (1957). Povijest Splita [History of Split]. Vol. I. Split: Matica Hrvatska.
- Novak, Grga (1961). Povijest Splita [History of Split]. Vol. II. Split: Matica Hrvatska.
- Novak, Grga (1965). Povijest Splita [History of Split]. Vol. III. Split: Matica Hrvatska.
- Novak, Grga (2004a). Prošlost Dalmacije [Dalmatia's Past]. Vol. I. Split: Marjan Tisak. ISBN 953-214-181-2.
- Novak, Grga (2004b). Prošlost Dalmacije [Dalmatia's Past]. Vol. II. Split: Marjan Tisak. ISBN 953-214-182-0.
- Šišić, Ferdo (1920). Povijest Hrvata; pregled povijesti hrvatskog naroda 600.–1918 [History of Croats; overview of the history of the Croatian people 600–1918]. Zagreb: St. Kugli.
