= Stocking (disambiguation) =

A stocking is a close-fitting garment covering the leg from the foot up to at least the knee.

Stocking may also refer to:

== Places ==
=== United States ===
- Stocking Township, Saunders County, Nebraska
- Stocking Branch, a stream in Georgia
- Stocking Creek, a stream in Minnesota
- Stocking Lake (Hubbard County, Minnesota)
- Stocking Lake (Wadena County, Minnesota)

=== Elsewhere ===
- Stocking, Styria, Austria, a former municipality
- Stocking Island, Bahamas
- Stocking Glacier, Victoria Land, Antarctica

== Other uses ==
- Stocking (surname), a surname
- Stocking (forestry), a measure of tree density
- Fish stocking, the practice of raising fish in a hatchery and releasing them into a river, lake, or ocean
- Stocking Anarchy, fictional character from anime series Panty & Stocking with Garterbelt
- Stocking, the white leg marking for horses

== See also ==
- Stocking Abbey, a former abbey in the village of Oldstead, North Yorkshire, England
- Samuel Stocking House, Morristown, New York, United States, on the National Register of Historic Places
- The Stockings, an Australian new wave band from 1979 to 1982
- Stock (disambiguation)
