= Stock (surname) =

Stock or Stöck is a surname of German origin. Notable people with the surname include:

- Albert Stock (1897–1969), Welsh international rugby player
- Alec Stock (1917–2001), English football manager
- Alejandro Stock (born 1965), Uruguayan artist
- Alfred Stock (1876–1946), German inorganic chemist
- Andrew Stock (born 1960), British artist
- Ann Stock, American government official
- Barbara Stock (born 1956), American actress
- Barry Stock (born 1974), Canadian guitarist
- Brian Stock (born 1981), Welsh footballer
- Christian Stock (1884–1967), German politician
- Constant Vanden Stock (1914–2008), Belgian footballer
- David Stock (1939–2015), American composer
- Debra Stock (born 1962), English cricketer
- Dennis Stock (1928–2010), American photographer
- Dora Stock (1760–1832), German artist
- Elliot Stock (1838–1911), English publisher
- Emil Stock (1868–1951), Croatian industrialist and businessman
- Francine Stock (born 1958), British journalist
- Frank Stock (born 1945), Hong Kong judge and lawyer
- Franz Stock (1904–1948), German priest in Paris during World War II
- Frederick Stock (1872–1942), German composer
- Gerhard Stöck (1911–1985), German athlete
- Gregory Stock, American biophysicist
- Hans-Christian Stock (1919–1945), German soldier
- Herb Stock (1899–1988), American football player
- James H. Stock (born 1956), American economist
- Jean-Pierre Stock (1900–1950), French rower
- Jeff Stock (born 1960), American soccer player
- Jon Stock (born 1966), British novelist
- Josef Stock (1938-2025), German politician (CDU)
- Joseph Stock (disambiguation)
- Jürgen Stock (born 1959), German law enforcement officer
- Kathleen Stock (born 1972), British professor of philosophy
- Lady Gertrude Stock (1842–1893), English novelist
- Lara Stock (born 1992), Croatian chess player
- Larry Stock (1896–1984), American musician
- Leonhard Stock (born 1958), Austrian skier
- Lionello Stock (1866–1948), Croatian-Italian industrialist, businessman
- Marcus Stock, tenth Roman Catholic Bishop of Leeds
- Mark Stock (1951–2014), American painter
- Mark Stock (American football) (born 1966), American football player
- Mike Stock (American football), American football coach
- Mike Stock (musician) (born 1951), English musician
- Milt Stock (1897–1977), American baseball player
- Nigel Stock (actor) (1919–1986), British actor
- Nigel Stock (bishop) (born 1950), British bishop
- P. J. Stock (born 1975), American hockey player
- Raymond Stock, American translator
- Reinhard Stock (born 1938), German nuclear physicist
- Richard Stock (1569–1626), English clergyman
- Robert Stock (born 1989), American baseball player
- Robert Stock (businessman) (1858–1912), German entrepreneur and telecommunications pioneer
- Robert Stock (tennis) (born 1944), American tennis player
- Robert Alfred Stock (fl. 1880s), founding managing director of the South Australian Brewing Company
- Roger Vanden Stock, Belgian footballer
- Ryan Stock, Canadian stunt man
- Sarah Stock (born 1979), Canadian wrestler
- Sebastian Stock (born 1977), German curler
- Simon Stock (1165–1265), 13th century English saint
- Thomas Stock (disambiguation)
- Uwe Stock (born 1947), German judoka who competed in the 1970 European Championships
- Valentine Stock (1852–1921), Canadian politician
- Victor Andrew Stock (born 1944), British clergyman
- Wes Stock (born 1934), American baseball player
- William Frederick Stock (1847–1913), South Australian lawyer and politician
- Wolfgang Stock (born 1959), German journalist

== Related surnames ==
- Stocken
- Stocker
- Stöcker
- Stok
- Stocks (surname)
- Stokel
