= Stocker (surname) =

Stocker is a surname, and may refer to:

- Abraham Stocker (1825–1887), Swiss politician
- Achim Stocker (1935–2009), German football chairman
- Adolf Stocker (1894–1979), Swiss fencer
- Andrei Stocker (1942–2025), Romanian football player and referee
- Arthur F. Stocker (1914–2010), American medievalist, classicist and academic
- Blanche Stocker (1884–1950), British actress and singer
- Bruce Stocker (1917–2004), English microbiologist
- Cathy Stocker, American District Attorney in Oklahoma
- Christian Stocker (born 1960), Austrian politician
- Doris Stocker (1886–1968), British actress and singer
- Gerda Stocker-Meyer (1912–1997), Swiss journalist
- Hanspeter Stocker (born 1936), Swiss footballer
- Harry Stocker (1840–1923), English Anglican priest
- Heini Stocker (born 1973), Liechtenstein footballer
- Helmuth Stocker, West German sprint canoer
- Horst Stocker (born 1962), Austrian modern pentathlete
- John Stocker (insurance agent) (died 1807), American merchant
- John Stocker (judge) (1918–1997), British judge
- John Stocker (voice actor) (born 1948), Canadian voice actor
- John Stocker (scientist) (born 1945), Australian scientist
- Jörg Stocker (c. 1461 – after 1527), German painter
- Kevin Stocker (born 1970), American baseball player
- Kevin Stocker (politician) (born 1960), American politician from Nebraska
- Laurent Stocker (born 1973), French theatre and cinema actor
- Les Stocker (1943–2016), British wildlife campaigner
- Liam Stocker (born 2000), Australian rules footballer
- Luke Stocker (born 1988) is an American football player and coach
- Marguerite Stocker (1901–1992), American prison governor
- Maria Stocker, Austrian woman, Righteous Among the Nations
- Mayme Stocker (1875–1972), Las Vegas casino owner
- Mel Stocker (born 1980), American baseball player
- Michael Stocker (1939–2024), American political philosopher
- Monte Stocker (1931–2008), American rower
- Peter Stocker (born 1956), Swiss rower
- Reinhard F. Stocker (born 1944), Swiss biologist
- Roland Stocker (born 1956), Swiss-Australian biochemist
- Sharon Stocker, American archeologist
- Stella Stocker (1858–1925), American composer, choral conductor and ethnomusicologist
- Thomas Stocker (born 1959), Swiss climate scientist
- Valentin Stocker (born 1989), Swiss football player
- Wally Stocker (born 1954), English rock guitarist
- Werner Stocker (actor) (1955–1993), German actor
- Werner Stocker (bobsledder) (born 1961), Swiss bobsledder

== See also ==
- Stöcker
- Stockert
