= Stock (disambiguation) =

Stock is a representation of capital paid or invested into a business entity by stockholders.

Stock may also refer to:

== Places ==
- Stock, Essex, England, a village and civil parish
  - Stock Windmill
- Stock, Podlaskie Voivodeship, Poland, a village
- Stock, Wiltshire, England, a small settlement
- Stock Farm, a northern suburb of Roseau, Dominica
- Stock Island, an island in the lower Florida Keys
- Stock Township, Harrison County, Ohio, United States
- Stock Township, Noble County, Ohio, United States

== People ==
- Stock (surname), a surname

== Arts, entertainment, and media ==
- Stock (album), by Akina Nakamori
- Stock, a fictional town in Eastfarthing, in the works of J. R. R. Tolkien
- Raw stock, undeveloped motion picture film
- Stock character, a stereotypical fictional character who audiences readily recognize
- Stock footage, film or video footage that can be used in other films
- Stock photography, the supply of photographs licensed for specific uses
- Stock sound effect, a prerecorded sound effect created for or contained within a sound effect library
- Summer stock theatre, American theatre concept
- Summer Stock, American film premised on Summer stock theatre

== Biology ==
=== Animals ===
- Stock (cage), a stall or cage used to restrain livestock
- Fish stock, semi-discrete subpopulations of a particular species of fish
- Foundation stock, individual or general type of horses used as the foundation animals that create a new breed or bloodline
- Livestock, animals kept for agricultural purposes
- Stock fish, a type of dried fish product

=== People ===
- Old Stock Americans, descendants of the original settlers of the Thirteen Colonies, of mostly British ancestry, who colonized America in the 17th and the 18th centuries
- Racial stock, an obsolete term referring to racial groups

=== Plants ===
- Stock (flower) (Matthiola), a genus of flowering plants
- Virginia stock (Malcolmia maritima), a garden plant

== Brands and enterprises ==
- Stock (publishing house), a French publisher and subsidiary of Hachette Livre, which itself is part of the Lagardère Group
- Elliot Stock, a London publisher of the works of, among others, William Blades
- Stock Spirits, a Polish company established in 1884
- Stock Transportation, a Canadian school bus operator

== Economics ==
- Stock (also capital stock) of a corporation, all of the shares into which ownership of the corporation is divided
- Stock (variable), in economics, business, or accounting, a variable measured at one specific time
- STOCK Act, the Stop Trading on Congressional Knowledge Act, an Act of Congress designed to combat insider trading
- Stock in trade or inventory, a supply of goods or materials held in storage by a business or household
- Tally stick § Split tally, in ancient financial accounting, the part of a split tally stick used as a receipt in a transaction

== Clothing ==
- Military stock, a leather collar issued to Napoleonic-era soldiers
- Stock tie, a tie worn around the neck of a competitor riding in an equestrian event

== Other uses ==
- Stock (firearms), a part of a gun which interfaces with the shoulder or hand
- Stock (food), a liquid flavoring base for soups and sauces
- Stock (geology), an igneous rock formation
- Stock, a type of changeling, a mythical creature
- Card stock, a type of paper
- Cattle catch or stocks, a move in some martial arts and wrestling
- Infant bed, for sleeping babies, rarely called a stock
- Label stock, a carrier for a label
- Rolling stock, the vehicles that move on a railway
- Stocks, a device for punishment or torture
- Stöckli, sometimes called Stock, a traditional agricultural building in Switzerland and parts of Germany
- Stock (dominoes), in dominoes, the tiles not picked up at the start which may be drawn later.
- Bar stock, a common form of raw purified metal

== See also ==
- Stalk (disambiguation)
- Standing stock (disambiguation)
- Stocker (disambiguation)
- Stocking (disambiguation)
- Stocks (disambiguation)
- Stocks (surname)
