= Morpurgo =

Morpurgo (Hebrew: מורפורגו) is an Italian surname of Jewish origin. Originally Marpurg, from the Styrian city Marburg an der Drau (today Maribor in Slovenia). Key ancestor was Moises Jacob, father of Petachia, in Bad Radkersburg, Austria. Petachia (1355–1460) had three sons who died in Maribor. Their subsequent multinational progeny took the surnames Maribor, Marburg, Marpurg, Morpurgo, Marlborough, Murphy.

Morpurgo may refer to:

- Alfred Morpurgo (1899–1973), Surinamese politician and journalist
- Anna Morpurgo Davies (1937–2014), Italian linguist at Oxford University.
- Clare Morpurgo, wife of Michael Morpurgo.
- Elio Morpurgo (1858–1944), Italian politician.
- Israel Isserlein (1380–1460) son of Petachia, had two sons, Aaron (1420–1490) and Keshel.
- Lisa Morpurgo (Dordoni) (1923–1998), Italian writer and astrologer.
- Michael Morpurgo (born 1943), English writer, especially of children's novels.
- Rachel Luzzatto Morpurgo (1790–1871), Jewish-Italian poet.
- Samson (ben Joshua Moses) Morpurgo (1681–1740), Italian rabbi, physician and liturgist.
- Tina Morpurgo (1907–1944), Croatian painter.
- Uberto De Morpurgo (1896– 1961), Italian tennis player.
- Vid Morpurgo (1838–1911), Croatian industrialist, publisher and politician.
- Vittorio Ballio Morpurgo (1890–1966), Italian architect.

Morpurgo may also refer to

- 5521 Morpurgo, an asteroid
- Palazzo Morpurgo, a palace in Udine
