= Frederick Stocks =

Frederick Stocks is the name of two English first-class cricketers, who were father and son:

- Frederick Stocks senior (1883–1954), played fleetingly for Northamptonshire
- Frederick Stocks junior (1918–1996), had a much long career for Nottinghamshire
