= Stocking Lake =

Stocking Lake may refer to:

- Stocking Lake (Hubbard County, Minnesota)
- Stocking Lake (Wadena County, Minnesota)
