= Stalker (disambiguation) =

A stalker is someone who engages in stalking.

Stalker or S.T.A.L.K.E.R may also refer to:

== Transportation ==
- Aeros Stalker, a hang glider
- Lockheed Martin Skunk Works Stalker, an electrically powered UAV
- APAL Stalker, a Russian jeep-like SUV

== Arts and media ==
=== Fictional characters ===
- Rex Stalker, character in the cartoon My Pet Monster
- Stalker (Batman Beyond), a supervillain from the Batman Beyond animated series
- Stalker (comics), a character from a short-lived DC "sword and sorcery" comic
- Stalker (G.I. Joe), a fictional character in the G.I. Joe universe
- Stalker (Gundam), a character from the anime series Mobile Fighter G Gundam

=== Film ===
- Stalker (film festival), a Russian film festival focused on human rights
- Stalker (1979 film), a Soviet science fiction art film directed by Andrei Tarkovsky
- Stalker (2010 film), a British psychological horror film directed by Martin Kemp
- Stalker (2012 film), an Irish psychological thriller directed by Mark O'Connor
- Stalker (2016 film), a Nigerian romantic drama film directed by Moses Inwang
- Stalker (2022 film), a British horror thriller directed by Steve Johnson

=== Games ===
- S.T.A.L.K.E.R., a first-person shooter franchise
  - S.T.A.L.K.E.R.: Shadow of Chernobyl, the first game in the franchise, also known as simply S.T.A.L.K.E.R.

=== Music ===
- Stalker (album), a 1995 dark ambient album by Lustmord & Robert Rich, inspired by the Tarkovsky film
- Stalker, a 2016 mini album by U-KISS
- "Stalker", a song by Aphrodite from his album Aphrodite
- "Stalker", a song by Audiovent from their album Dirty Sexy Knights in Paris
- "Stalker", a song by Bruno Sutter from his album Bruno Sutter
- "Stalker", a song by Cascada from their album Original Me
- "Stalker", a song by Goldfinger from their album Disconnection Notice
- "Stalker", a song by Recoil from their album Unsound Methods
- "The Stalker", a song by the Insane Clown Posse from their EP Beverly Kills 50187

=== Print ===
- Stalker, an alternative title for The Wish Machine, the screenplay for Tarkovsky's film Stalker
- Stalkers (comics), a 1990s comics limited series
- Stalker x Stalker, a webcomic/webtoon series by Merryweather Media

=== Television ===
- Stalker (TV series), a 2014 TV series starring Maggie Q and Dylan McDermott
- "Stalker" (CSI), an episode of the American television series CSI
- "Stalker" (The Walking Dead), 2020 television episode

== People ==
- Stalker (surname), several people
- The Stalker, the ring name for professional wrestler Barry Windham

== Other uses ==
- Stalker (horse)

== See also ==
- Stalk (disambiguation)
- Deer stalking, a British term for the stealthy hunting of deer without hounds or horses
- Chernobyl stalking, making illegal visits to the Chernobyl nuclear disaster site
- Stalked: Murder in Slow Motion, a 2019 British crime documentary narrated by Kym Marsh
