= Stock Township =

Stock Township may refer to the following places:

In Canada

- Stock Township, Cochrane District, Ontario

In the United States

- Stock Township, Harrison County, Ohio
- Stock Township, Noble County, Ohio

See also

- Stock (disambiguation)
