= John Stocker =

John Stocker may refer to:

- John Stocker (voice actor)
- John Stocker (insurance agent) (died 1807), Philadelphia resident in the 18th century
- John Stocker (scientist) (born 1945), Australian immunologist
- John Stocker (judge) (1918-1997), British judge
