= 2016 Jersey by-election =

Freelancermdabdullasiddiki

A by-election for a Senator to the States of Jersey was held on 7 September 2016, after the resignation of Zoe Cameron on 12 July 2016.

== Results ==
Senatorial by-election, 2016
| Party | Candidate | Votes | % | ±% |
|---|---|---|---|---|
| Independent | Sarah Ferguson | 3,649 | 29.7 | |
| Reform Jersey | Sam Mézec | 3,518 | 28.6 | |
| Independent | Christian May | 2,018 | 16.4 | |
| Independent | John Young | 1,240 | 10.1 | |
| Independent | Hugh Raymond | 988 | 8.0 | |
| Independent | Guy de Faye | 254 | 2.1 | |
| Independent | Mary O'Keeffe-Burgher | 246 | 2.0 | |
| Independent | Nick Le Cornu | 139 | 1.1 | |
| Independent | Alvin Aaron | 103 | 0.8 | |
| Independent | Mike Dun | 73 | 0.6 | |
| Independent | Stevie Ocean | 70 | 0.6 | |
| Majority | | 131 | 1.1 | |
| Turnout | | 12,298 | 19.1 | |
| Registered electors | | 64,462 | | |
| Independent hold | | Swing | | |
