= Jersey College for Girls =

Girls' fee-paying school in Saint Saviour, Jersey

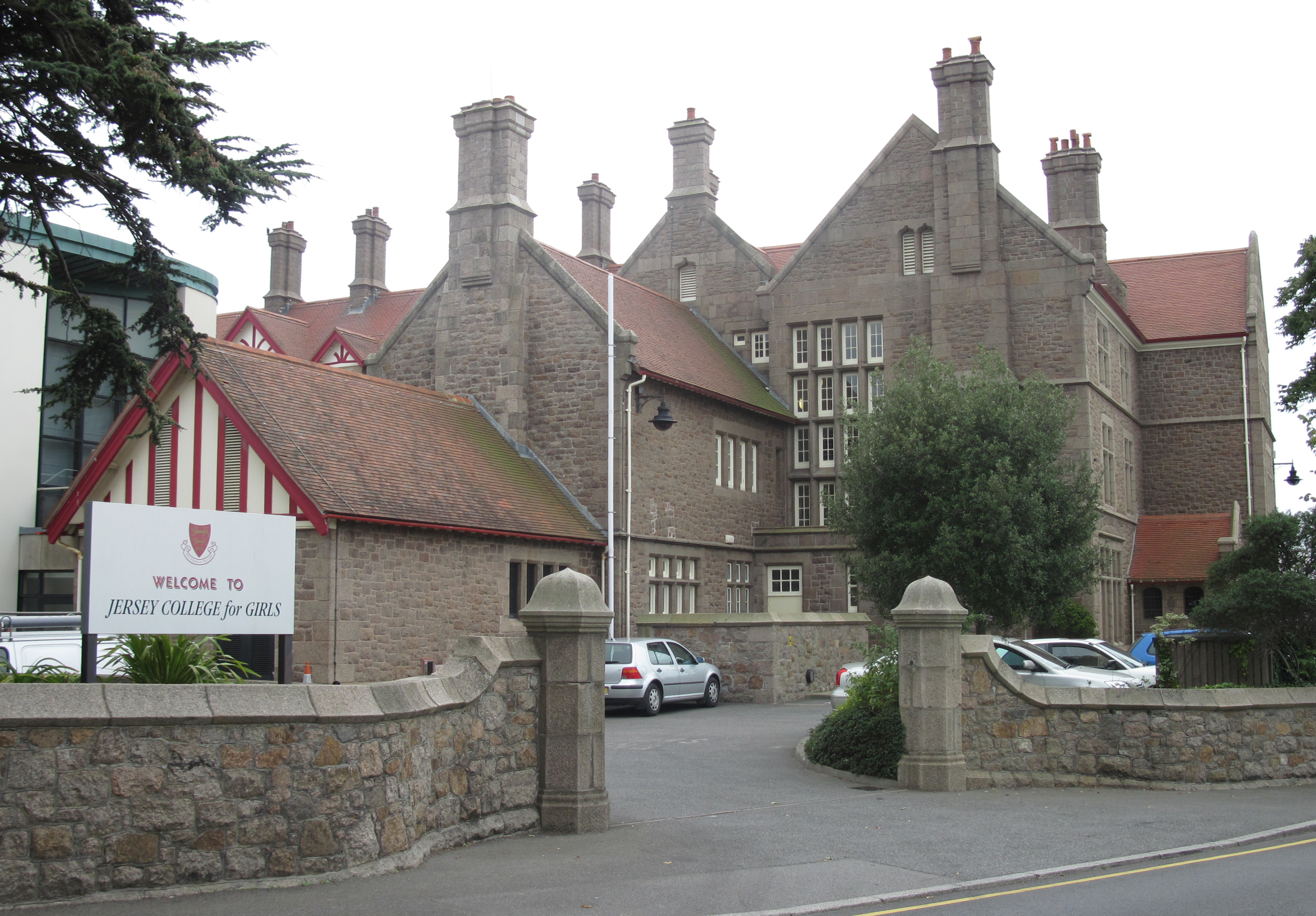

Location
- Mont Millais; Saint Saviour, Jersey; 49.1865°N 2.0936°W

Information
- Former name: Jersey Ladies' College
- Type: Fee-paying Government-run Selective School for Girls
- Motto: Aspire, Inquire, Excel and Belong
- Religious affiliations: Christian; Non-denominational
- Established: 1880; 146 years ago
- Sister school: Victoria College, Jersey
- Authority: Government of Jersey, Department for Children, Young People, Education and Skills
- Principal: Carl Howarth
- Gender: Girls
- Age: 11 to 18
- Enrolment: 766
- Houses: Austen Bartlett, Cavell, Curie Fry, Garrett Anderson, Inglis and Nightingale
- Colours: Red and grey
- Website: jerseycollegeforgirls.com

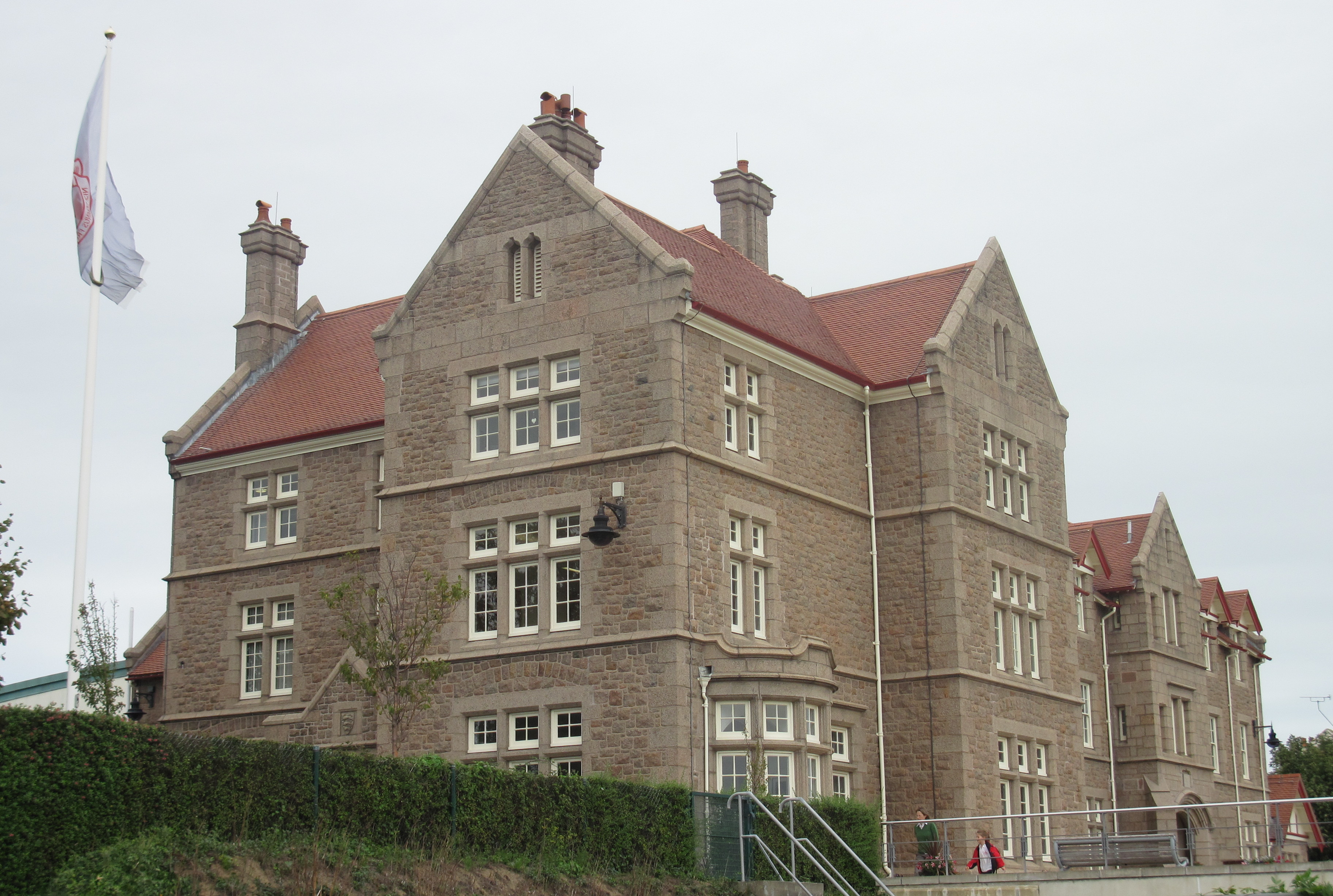
Jersey College for Girls

Jersey College for Girls (Jèrriais: Lé collège jèrriais pour les fil'yes), commonly referred to as JCG, is a government-run, fee-paying, academically selective secondary school for girls in Saint Saviour, Jersey. It was founded in 1880 in Saint Helier as Jersey Ladies' College. In 1887, the college moved to a purpose-built site on La Pouquelaye and in 1999, it moved again to its present site, on Mont Millais, across from Victoria College, the government fee-paying school for boys.

Despite being owned by the States of Jersey, JCG charges tuition fees of £2,813 per term in the 2024/25 school year.

== History ==
=== 1880-1999 ===
The situation for the education of girls in Jersey from the mid-19th century lagged behind provision for boys. Victoria College had been opened for boys, on the pattern of English public schools, in 1852. The well-to-do and the élite classes continued to employ governesses or to send their daughters to schools in France or England; other classes relied on the existing elementary schools in Jersey. Jersey people of influence gathered at the Grove Place Wesleyan Chapel in Saint Helier on 28 November 1879 and decided to set up a limited liability company to further a plan to provide a college for girls in Jersey. The then Bailiff of Jersey, Sir Robert Pipon Marett, became patron of the enterprise and an advertisement appeared in the British Press and Jersey Times in June 1880 to announce the forthcoming opening of the new college in September of that year: "It is designed to give to the daughters of residents and others, at an extremely moderate rate, an education of the highest order. Its promoters have long felt there is a pressing need for such an institution in Jersey".

The school was opened in September 1880 as Jersey Ladies' College, located at Adelaide House in Roussel Street, Saint Helier. Girls were put in for Oxford and Cambridge Local Examinations and Matriculation of London University, and those who had studied in France were able to take the Brevet de capacité in Paris. In 1883 3 students achieved distinction in the Matriculation Examination of London University; the first ladies to have matriculated from Jersey.

In 1887, the Ladies' College acquired property at La Pouquelaye, fronting Rouge Bouillon, in Saint Helier. A new building was constructed (architect: Adolphus Curry (1848–1910)), and the school moved to the new site in 1888. This building has been called "one of the most identifiable buildings in the island". After the First World War the school acquired the neighbouring Mont Cantel site for use as a junior school. The school was purchased in 1928 by the Church of England Schools' Trust. The school changed its name to the Jersey College for Girls, and in 1935 was taken over by the States of Jersey. The Germans occupying Jersey during World War II used the school building first as a barracks and then as a naval hospital.

Since the move of the college to a new site, the 1888 building has been used for other educational functions, but has fallen into disrepair; it has now been proposed for residential redevelopment, while maintaining the historical portions of the old building. The Mont Cantel site formerly occupied by the preparatory school was used by the Jersey Schools Instrumental Service and by Janvrin School, a States primary school for a number of years before being abandoned completely.

=== Move of the College ===
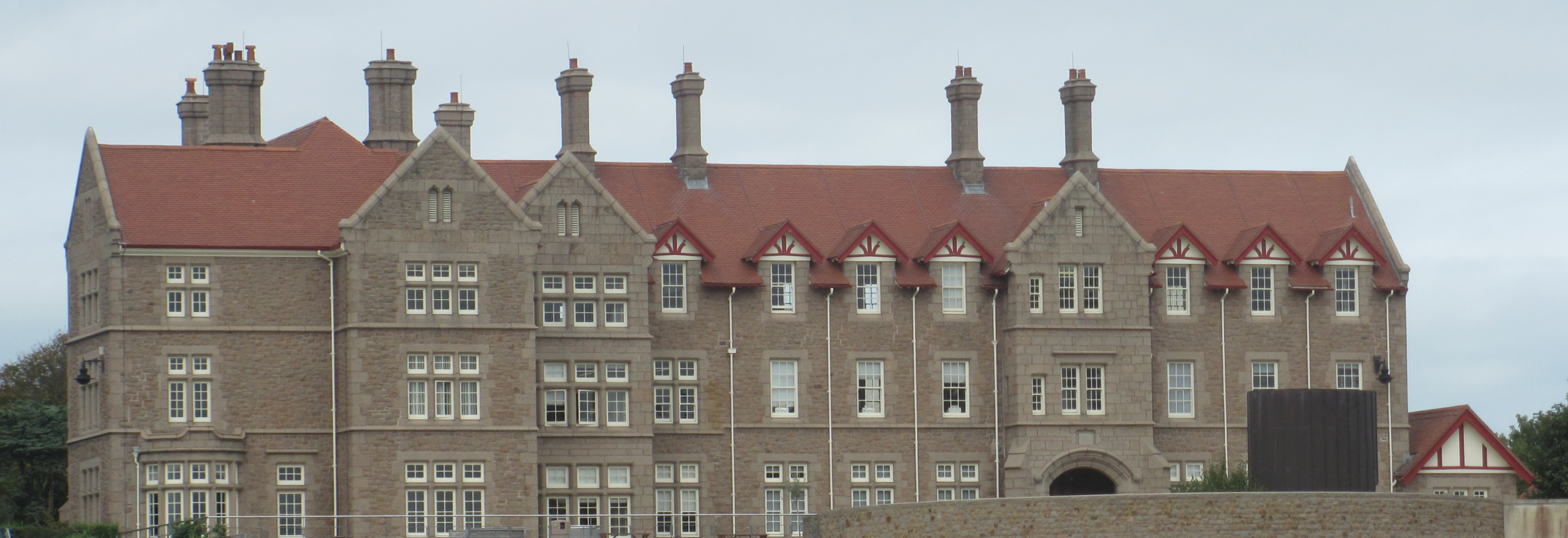
The College House frontage

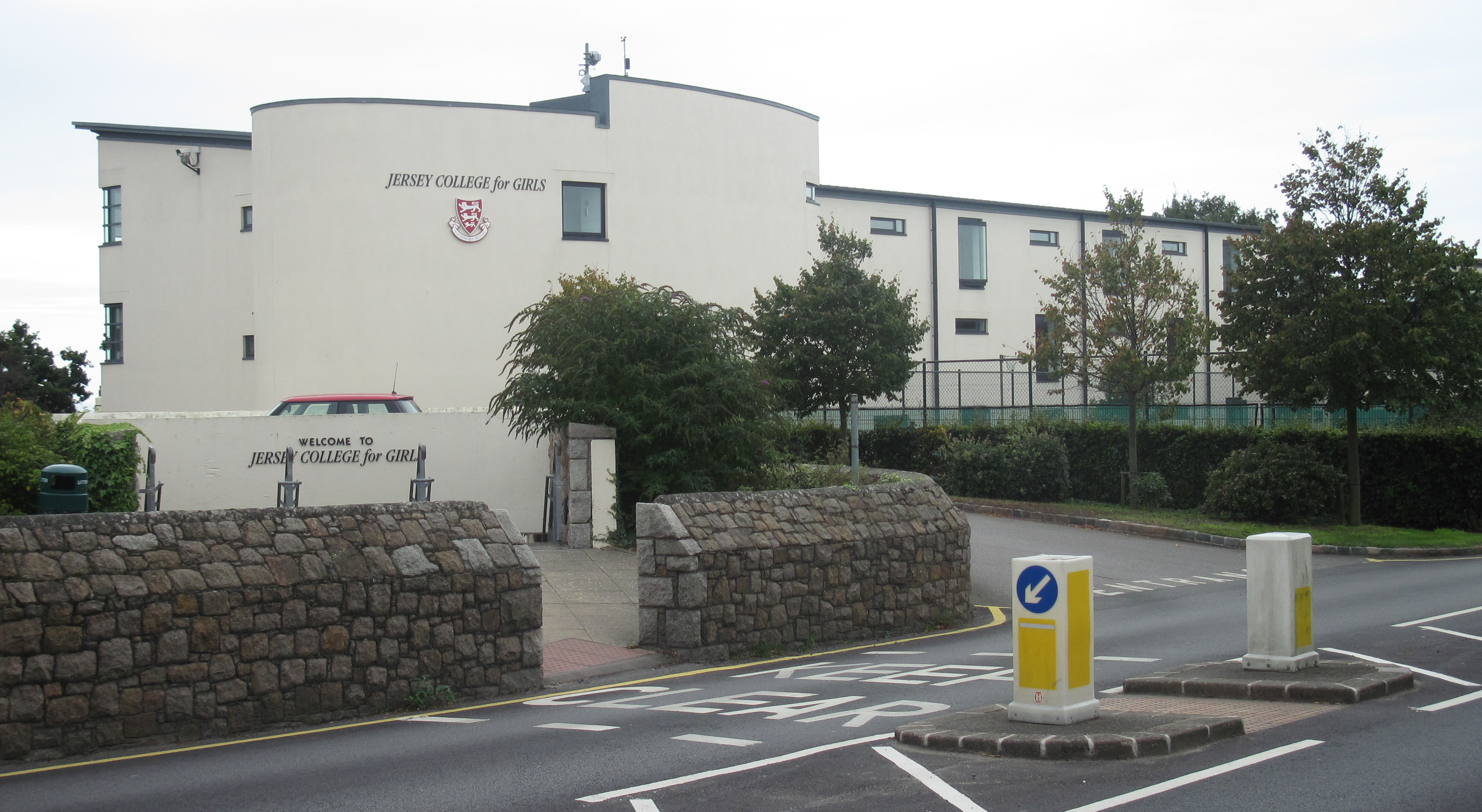
The Modern Buildings

With increasing sixth-form collaboration between JCG and Victoria College and a need to provide new facilities, it was decided to move the college to a new site. The end of boarding provision at Victoria College meant that College House, built as a boarding house for Victoria College in 1901 (architect: Edmund Berteau (1861–1935)) and used as the Feldkommandantur by the German occupying forces 1940–1945, was available for redevelopment and re-use by JCG. A new wing was added behind the 1901 building with further facilities built in front on part of College Field. The transformation was designed by ArchitecturePLB (formerly Plincke, Leaman and Browning). In 1999, Jersey College for Girls moved to the new site.

== Houses ==
The Houses at JCG are named after Inspirational historical women. There used to be eight but the school merged Austen and Bartlett and Curie and Fry together to make the House system easier.

Houses
House	Named after	Colour	Mascot
Austen Bartlett	Jane Austen, Marie Bartlett	Turquoise	Dolphin
Cavell	Edith Cavell	Blue	Eeyore
Curie Fry	Marie Curie, Elizabeth Fry	Pink	Pig
Garrett Anderson	Elizabeth Garrett Anderson	Red	Dragon
Inglis	Elsie Inglis	Green	Turtle
Nightingale	Florence Nightingale	Yellow	Duck

Each year the six houses compete towards the "Cock House trophy", awarded to the house with the most points from inter-house competitions, at the end of the school year.

== Notable former pupils ==
- Fleur Anderson, politician
- Florence Baron, barrister and judge
- Zoe Cameron, former Senator of the States of Jersey
- Adelaide Casely-Hayford, activist for cultural nationalism, educator, short story writer, and feminist
- Helen Chambers, pathologist and cancer expert
- Libby Hart, sport shooter
- Jenny Hill, journalist
- Lilian Mary Grandin (1876–1924), physician, medical missionary and the first Jerseywoman to qualify as a physician
- Nia Greig, cricketer, youngest person to play international cricket
- Nerina Pallot, nominated for British Female Solo Artist at the 2007 BRIT Awards and nominated for an Ivor Novello Award for "Sophia" in the category of 'Best Song' in the same year
- Marguerite Stocker, Governor of HM Prison Askham Grange, Yorkshire
- Jude Terry, first woman to be promoted to rear admiral in the Royal Navy

== See also ==
- List of schools in Jersey
- Victoria College, Jersey
