= Stöckli (disambiguation) =

A stöckli is a type of agricultural building traditionally found in Switzerland. It may also refer to:

== People ==
- Béatrice Stöckli, Swiss missionary
- Franz Stöckli, Swiss bobsledder
- Fritz Stöckli, Swiss bobsledder
- Oliver Stöckli, Swiss footballer
- Ralph Stöckli, Swiss curler

== Other ==
- Stöckli Swiss Sports AG, a ski manufacturer
