= Stecker =

Stecker is a surname. Notable people with the surname include:

- Aaron Stecker (born 1975), American football player
- Curley Stecker (1892–1924), American animal trainer
- Franz Stecker, Austrian luger
- Leah Stecker (born 2003), American ice hockey player
- Margaret L. Stecker (1885–1977), American economist

== See also ==
- Stecher (surname)
- Stucker (surname)
