= Stocks (disambiguation) =

Stocks refers to a device used to imprison the feet as punishment.

It may also refer to:

- Stock, the equity of a company, referred to as Stocks and Shares
- Stocks (surname)
- Stocks (shipyard), an external framework used to support ships while under construction

== See also ==
- Stock (disambiguation)
