= Stocks (surname) =

Stocks is a surname. Notable people with the surname include:

- Amber Stocks (born 1978), American basketball coach
- Cheridah de Beauvoir Stocks (1887–1971) second British woman to gain a Royal Aero Club aviator's licence.
- Cyril Stocks (1905–1989), English footballer
- David Stocks (born 1943), English footballer
- Edward Stocks (1856–1876), English cricketer and athlete
- Francis Stocks (1873–1929), English cricketer and schoolteacher
- Frederick Stocks senior (1883–1954), English cricketer
- Frederick Stocks junior (1918–1996), English cricketer
- Harold Carpenter Lumb Stocks (1884–1956), English cathedral organist
- John Stocks (disambiguation), various people
- Lumb Stocks (1812–1892), English engraver
- Mary Stocks, Baroness Stocks (1891–1975), British writer, suffragist and principal of Westfield College
- Minna Stocks (1846–1928), German painter
- Nigel G. Stocks (born 1964), British physicist who discovered suprathreshold stochastic resonance, with application to cochlear implant technology
- Samuel Stocks (c.1786–1863), British businessman in South Australia
- Samuel Stocks, jun. (c.1812–1850), businessman in South Australia, son of the above Samuel Stocks
- Tamara Stocks (born 1979), American basketball player
- Zoah Hedges-Stocks, English journalist

== See also ==
- Stock (surname)
