= Stocking Creek =

Stream in Wadena County, Minnesota, U.S.

Coordinates: 46°47′15″N 95°02′10″W

Stocking Creek is a stream in Wadena County, in the U.S. state of Minnesota.

Stocking Creek was named for the fact it heads at Stocking Lake.

== See also ==
- List of rivers of Minnesota
