= Helen Chambers =

British pathologist (1879–1935)

Helen Chambers CBE
- Born: 18 July 1879; Bombay, India
- Died: 21 July 1935 (aged 56)
- Education: Newnham College, Cambridge; London School of Medicine for Women; London University
- Occupations: Pathologist; cancer expert
- Known for: Research on radium as a treatment for cancer

Helen Chambers CBE (18 July 1879 – 21 July 1935) was a British pathologist and cancer expert whose findings on radium were essential in the fight against cervical cancer.

== Early life ==
Chambers was born in Bombay, India, to Frederick Chambers. Her father was a member of the Indian Civil Service before returning the family back to Britain.

== Education and early research ==
Chambers studied at the Jersey Ladies' College, and Park Street Girls' School in Cambridge before going up to Newnham College, Cambridge, where she studied chemistry and physics. Chambers entered the London School of Medicine for Women in 1898 to train as a doctor. She continued her studies at London University, graduating Bachelor of Medicine (MB) with first-class honors and the gold medal for medicine in 1903. She earned her Bachelor of Surgery (BS) in 1904, and in the same year joined the Royal Free Hospital as a pathologist, taking charge of the department at the age of only 24. Four years later, in 1908, she gained her Doctor of Medicine (MD) in pathology for her thesis "Observations on pathology of the thyroid gland". She also lectured over pathology at the University of London. Chambers received a scholarship in cancer research becoming a part-time researcher at the Cancer Research Laboratories at the Middlesex Hospital, where she worked with physics and radium expert, Sidney Russ. From 1911 to 1913, Russ and Chambers studied the biological effects of radium. During this time, they published works in the Proceedings of the Royal Society and the Archives of the Middlesex Hospital. These works made Chambers a reputable cancer researcher.

== Career ==
During the First World War, she worked at the Endell Street Military Hospital, the only British wartime hospital entirely staffed by women, as the consultant pathologist. The women doctors and surgeons treated thousands of soldiers with wound infections. Chambers created a new antiseptic called bismuth-iodoform-paraffin-paste or Bipp. This antiseptic reduced the amount of infections and provided an alternative to wound dressing on a daily basis. For this work she was appointed Commander of the Order of the British Empire (CBE) in January 1920.

After the war, she took a full-time cancer research appointment with the Medical Research Council at the Middlesex Hospital's Barnato Joel Laboratories, being named the radium research officer. She researched immunology and radiobiology of tumours in the early 1920s but she recognised the potential of radium for treating cancer. Thus, she decided to focus on radiotherapy for treating cancer of the cervix. In her 1924 lecture, "Progress in cancer problems", Chambers urged women doctors to treat their cancer patients with radium. In 1924–1925 she organised a group of female doctors in an effort to improve the use of radium in cancer treatment, especially of women, at the Royal Free Hospital, Elizabeth Garrett Anderson Hospital, South London Hospital and New Sussex Hospital in Brighton. The British Empire Cancer Campaign gave Chambers and the other researchers a large supply of radium. The women implemented a Swedish technique which improved the five-year survival statistics. By 1928, they had treated 300 cases, and realised their need for a centre for treating women's cancers. The success of this project, combined with Chambers' foresight and dedication, led to the establishment of the Marie Curie Hospital on Fitzjohn's Avenue, Hampstead, in 1930, where she became pathologist. In little time, the hospital showed increasing survival rates and was considered the main centre for treating women's cancers.

== Personal life and legacy ==
Chambers never married, dedicating her entire life to science and research. She lived in Watford, and on 21 July 1935, died of breast cancer. In 1937, two years after her death, the Marie Curie Hospital named its new pathology laboratory the Helen Chambers Research Laboratory in her honour.
