= Emil Stock =

Italian industrialist and businessman

Emilio Stock
- Born: 3 August 1868; Split, Kingdom of Dalmatia, Austria-Hungary
- Died: 1951 (aged 83); Trieste, Free Territory of Trieste
- Occupations: Industrialist, businessman
- Spouse: Irma Hirschel
- Relatives: Abramo and Gentile Stock (parents); Lionello Stock (brother) Lelio Stock (brother)

Emilio Stock (1868–1951) was an Italian industrialist and businessman of Jewish origin.

Stock was born in Split, Croatia (at that time formally the Kingdom of Dalmatia), on 3 August 1868 to Abramo and Gentile (née Valenzin) Stock, as one of 12 children. Stock's paternal Ashkenazi Jewish family originated from Frankfurt am Main, German Empire, while his maternal Sephardi Jewish family arrived in Split during Napoleonic era. His father moved to Split in 1844 from Trieste, which was then part of the Austrian Empire. Stock graduated from university with a civil engineering degree. After graduation he built a cement factory near Solin, and also a factory of asbestos-cement products. At the beginning of the 1900s Stock became involved in the production of alcoholic beverages. In 1905 Stock, along with Vid Morpurgo, another Croatian Jewish industrialist, founded the alcoholic beverages company "Morpurgo, Stock e Comp." Stock 84 was being produced in the Split-based old Morpurgo factory. The new company obtained the franchise to construct a new liquor factory on the outskirts of Split (today part of the city). The factory concession was subsequently challenged by the municipal prefect Vicko Mihaljević, ostensibly due to environmental issues, while some attributed the problem to a political conflict between the owners and the municipal authorities. Disappointed by the withdrawal of the concession, Stock and Morpurgo went on to build the factory in Rovinj, Croatia. The business was prosperous so Stock and his partner decided to build a second plant in Trieste, where Stock's brother Lionel already owned the steam wine distillery "Distilleria a vapore Camis & Stock" (now Fernet Stock) which produced cognac "Medicinal". Stock died in Trieste in 1951.

== Bibliography ==
- Kečkemet, Duško (1971). Židovi u povijesti Splita. Split: Jevrejska općina, Split.
