= Stalk =

Stalk or stalking may refer to:

== Behaviour ==
- Stalk, the stealthy approach (phase) of a predator towards its prey
- Stalking, an act of intrusive behaviour or unwanted attention towards a person
- Deer stalking, the pursuit of deer for sport

== Biology ==
- Petiole (botany), a leaf stalk
- Peduncle (botany), a stalk of an inflorescence or a solitary flower
- Pedicel (botany), a stalk of a flower in an inflorescence
- Plant stem, one of two main structural axes of a vascular plant
- Pituitary stalk, a part of the brain

== Other uses ==
- Stalk (sheaf), a mathematical construction
- The Stalk, a 1994 science fiction novel by Chris Morris and Janet Morris
- Stalk (TV series), French television series

== See also ==
- Stock (disambiguation)
- Stork (disambiguation)
- Stalker (disambiguation)
