= Francis Trumble =

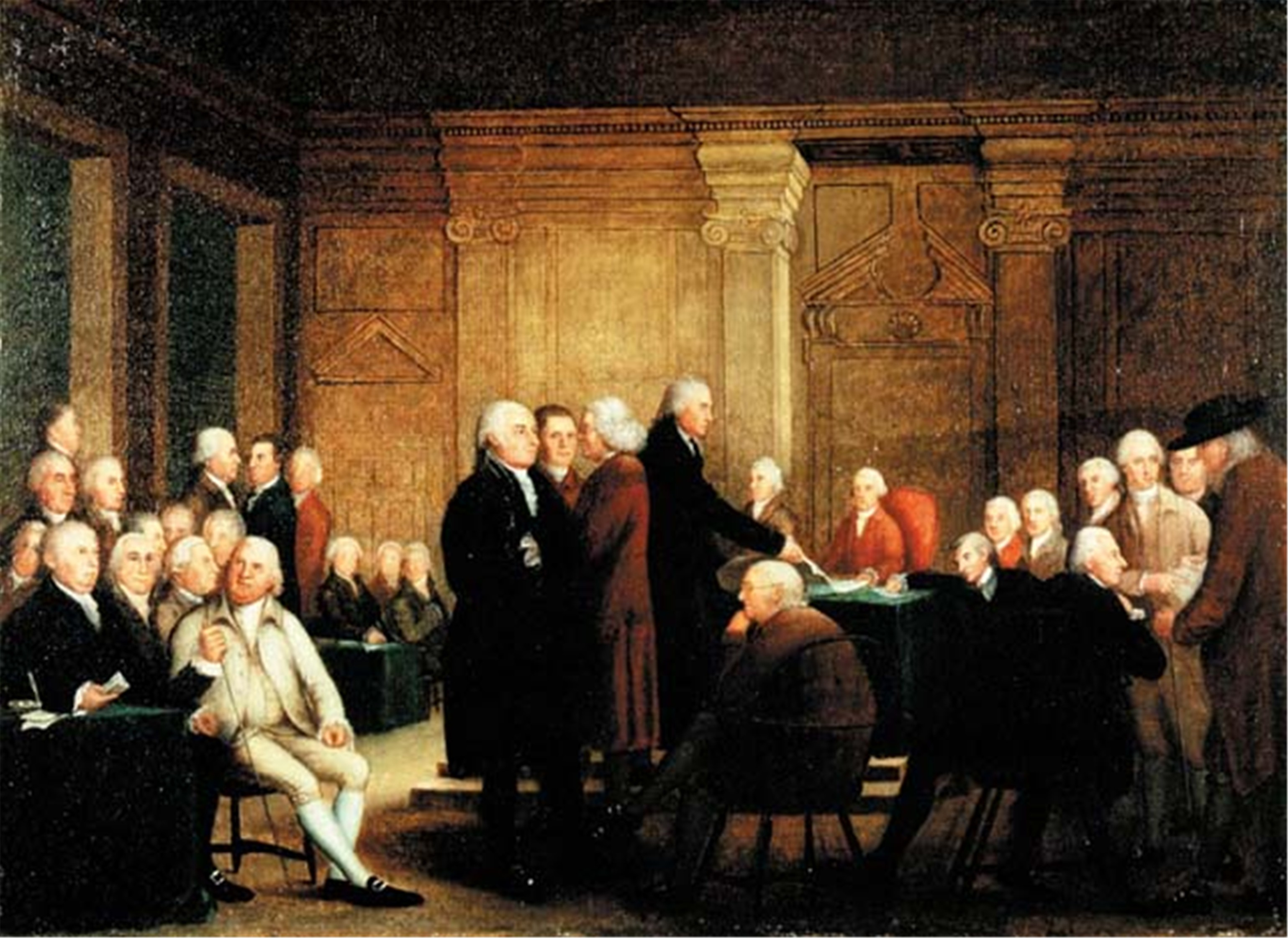
Congress Voting Independence (ca. 1784-88) by Robert Edge Pine.

Francis Trumble was an 18th-century chair and cabinetmaker in Philadelphia, Pennsylvania.

Trumble produced a variety of "fine furniture" in the Queen Anne, Chippendale and Federal styles. He also manufactured Windsor chairs that are believed to be the ones used at Independence Hall by the Second Continental Congress, and depicted in paintings of the signing of the Declaration of Independence. He made them in seven styles and is credited as one of the craftsmen who establish the industry producing the chairs.

Tumble occupied a shop on the "John Stocker property" on Front Street from 1745 until his death in 1791. A privy pit has been excavated on the site uncovering iron gouges, chisels, gravers, an iron rasp, iron spikes, nails, and handles of wood and bone.

== See also ==
- Windsor furniture
