= Rachel Luzzatto Morpurgo =

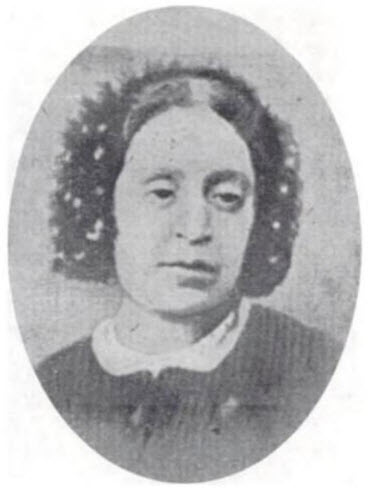
- Born: Rachel Luzzatto; 8 April 1790; Imperial Free City of Trieste
- Died: 1871 (aged 80–81)
- Spouse: Jacob Morpurgo (m. 1819)
- Writing career
- Language: Hebrew

Rachel Luzzatto Morpurgo (Hebrew: רחל לוצאטו מורפורגו; 8 April 1790 – 1871) was a Jewish-Italian poet. She is said to be the first Jewish woman to write poetry in Hebrew under her own name in two thousand years.

== Life ==
Morpurgo was born in Trieste, Holy Roman Empire into the prosperous Luzzatto family that produced many Jewish scholars and intellectuals, including her cousin Samuel David Luzzatto (1800–1865), whose support and encouragement were important to the recognition she received in her lifetime. In 1819, she married Jacob Morpurgo, also a member of a prominent Jewish Italian family. Morpurgo is Italianised "Marburger", from where the family originated. She moved to Gorizia and had four children, three boys and a girl.

Her parents provided a rich education with private tutors and a large private library. She worked in the family business at a potter's wheel and had little leisure to write. After she married, her time was almost entirely consumed with domestic duties. Nevertheless, she wrote throughout her whole life and published some fifty poems in the journal Kochbe Yitzhak (כוכבי יצחק, 'The Stars of Isaac'). She was writing a poem a few days before her death at the age of eighty-one.

== Poetic themes ==
Morpurgo scholar Tova Cohen of Bar-Ilan University writes:

Morpurgo's main poetic achievements are not her "poems written at leisure" or her nationalist poems (to which critics related), but rather her poems of personal contemplation (including "See, This Is New," "Lament of My Soul," "Why, Lord, So Many Cries," "O Troubled Valley," "Until I Am Old"). The power of these poems derives from their having been written on two levels. The first and most evident is their following the accepted cultural conventions of contemporary masculine poetry, exploiting the writer's broad knowledge of the canon. The second level of significance is subtle and reveals itself in the contrast between the canonical texts to which it refers and the poem itself. On this level we hear the voice of a woman describing her suffering and protesting her inferior status in Jewish society and culture.

Today Morpurgo has attracted attention as an early feminist poet. Some of her poems reflect her frustration at being ignored as a woman or being dismissed as a poet because she was a woman. For instance, in "On Hearing She Had Been Praised in the Journals" (1847):

I've looked to the north, south, east, and west:
a woman's word in each is lighter than dust.
years hence, will anyone really remember

her name, in city or province, any more
than a dead dog. Ask: the people are sure:
a woman's wisdom is only in spinning wool.

She signed the poem "Wife of Jacob Morpurgo, stillborn." She also signed some poems Rachel Morpurgo Ha-Ketana ('Rachel Morpurgo, the Little One'). She would abbreviate this signature as RMH, the Hebrew word for worm. Some critics have argued that she was not merely expressing humility but making an ironic comment on the contempt some male critics had for her.

== Critical reception ==
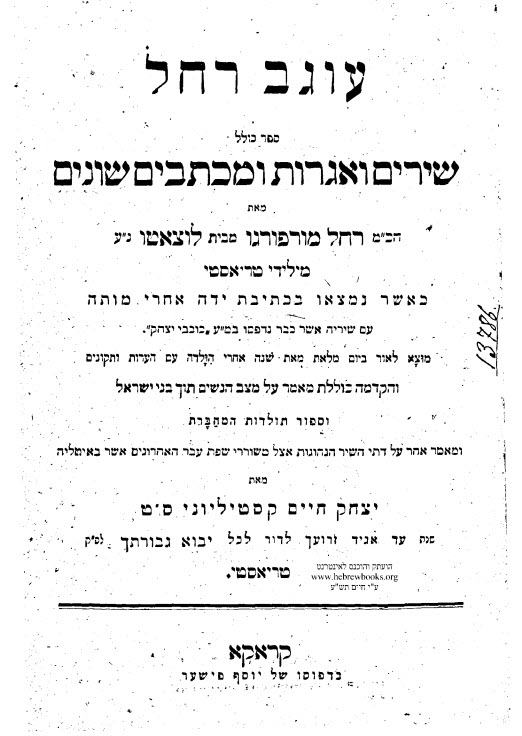
Title page of Ugav Rachel

In Morpurgo's time, Jewish women were rarely taught Hebrew, which was considered strictly the province of men and suitable only for religious subjects and discourse. Under the influence of the Haskalah, the Jewish Enlightenment, Hebrew began to be used for secular subjects and the foundation was laid for the modern Hebrew language. Morpurgo's literary interest thus found an audience and sympathetic reception that would not have existed earlier. In addition, the endorsement of her highly respected cousin Samuel David Luzzatto gave her prominence that would have been hard to attain on her own.

A woman writing Hebrew poetry was sufficiently unusual at the time that many readers doubted the poems were written by a woman. Some visited her home in Trieste to confirm she actually existed. One critic assumed that she must have reached menopause on the belief that biological fertility ruled out literary creativity. The modern literary critic Dan Miron has dismissed her as a "rhymester of the Hebrew Enlightenment" and contended that she "should be distinguished from the few serious poets of the period, who struggled spiritually and poetically with their optimistic rational worldview, on the one hand, and the social cultural and spiritual state of the people, on the other."

None of her works was published after the death of her cousin until a collection of her poems, Ugav Rachel (עוגב רחל, 'Rachel's Harp'), was published in 1890.
