= Marguerite Stocker =

- Born: 2 March 1901; Jersey
- Died: July 1992 (aged 91)
- Known for: governor of HM Prison Askham Grange

Marguerite Ellen-Gaudin Stocker MBE (2 March 1901 – July 1992) was governor of HM Prison Askham Grange in Yorkshire from 1959 until her retirement in 1967.

== Early life ==
Marguerite Stocker was born in Jersey to Walter Arthur and Louisa Jane Stocker (née Gaudin) on 2 March 1901.

She attended Jersey Ladies' College, now Jersey College for Girls. She left school in the summer of 1918.

Marguerite's sister was Chief Commander Kathleen Gaudin Stocker in the Auxiliary Territorial Service (ATS) and was recognised for her service by the award of Military Division of the Order of the British Empire, 1945.

== Career ==
In September 1918 Stocker became an apprentice engineer at Galloway Engineering Co. in Tongland near Kirkcudbright, Dumfries and Galloway, Scotland. The Tongland factory was set up by Thomas Pullinger for manufacture of aero engines during World War One. The factory advertised professional training for female engineers, beyond usual war work, and was described as "a fine university for women engineers".

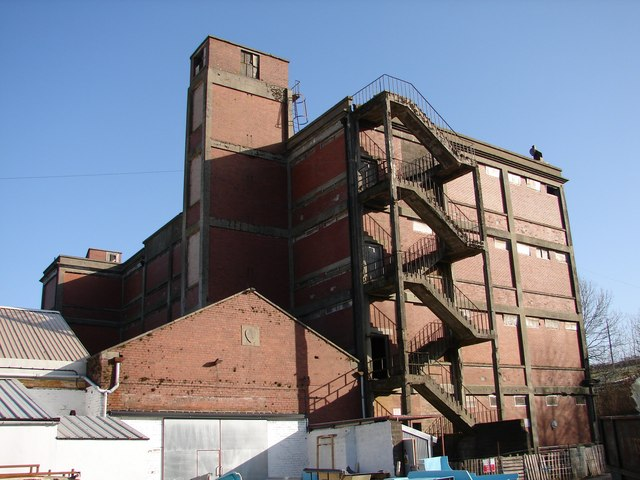
Tongland Works of the Galloway Engineering Company.

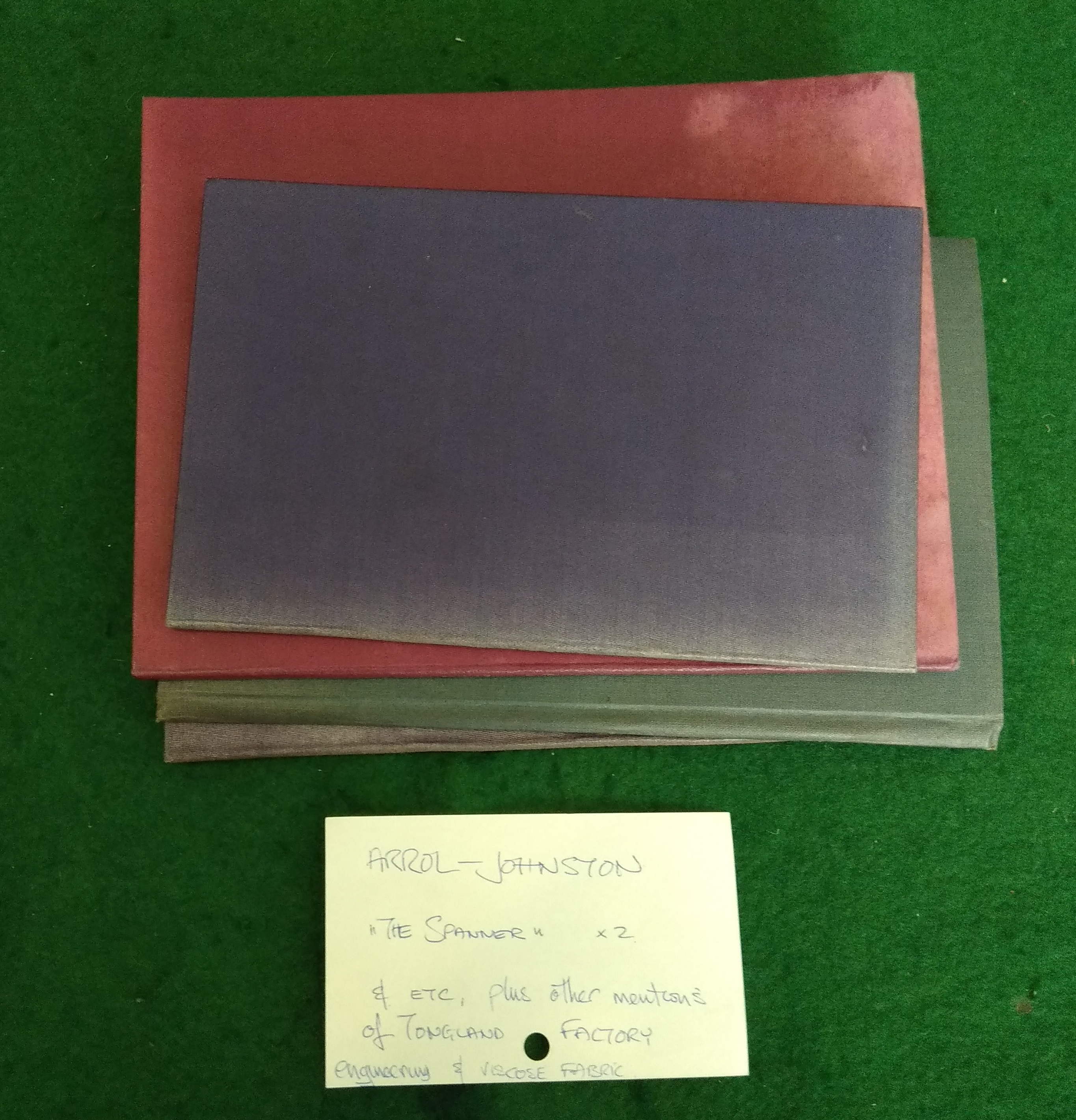
Bound copies of "The Limit" and "The Spanner", works magazines from Galloway Engineering Co and Arrol-Johnston Co.

Stocker wrote about her experiences at Galloway Engineering Co in the Tongland factory's works magazine The Limit, under the name "M.E.G.S.", including "New Girl's Impression" in March 1919, "Monday-itis" in September 1919, and "A Lament" in February 1920. In 1922, having left Tongland, Stocker described her "two and a half years' course of engineering" in the Jersey Ladies' College "Past and Present Review".

During World War Two, Stocker served in the Auxiliary Territorial Service (ATS) at the rank of 2nd Subaltern.

In 1957 Stocker was appointed as governor of Hill Hall women's prison in Essex, on the death of the previous governor, Joan Wilson, formerly of the Women's Prison Manchester. In 1959 Stocker became governor of Askham Grange women's prison in Yorkshire, which operated on open prison conditions. She succeeded Joanna Kelley, who left to become governor of HM Prison Holloway.

Stocker contributed her expertise as a prison governor to an article on "Correctional Systems and National Values" in 1960.

She was a guest at the 6th Annual Women of the Year lunch at the Savoy Hotel in London in October 1960, alongside Margaret Thatcher

Stocker was awarded the honour of Member of the Order of the British Empire (MBE) in the Queen's Birthday Honours of June 1965.

In October 1976 Stocker was interviewed by Caroline Parsons on BBC Woman's Hour about her days as a prison governor.
