= Standing stock =

Standing stock may refer to:

- Biomass (ecology) of a stock of organisms
- Population density, a measurement of population per unit area or unit volume
- Livestock crush, British English for the device called a stock or standing stock in the USA, used for restraining livestock

== See also ==
- Stock (disambiguation)
