= Florence Baron =

British judge (1952–2013)

Dame Florence Jacqueline Baron DBE (7 October 1952 – 9 December 2013), judicially styled The Hon. Mrs Justice Baron, was a British barrister and High Court Judge.

== Early life and education ==
Baron was born to Owsiej ("Jose") and Ellen Elizabeth Baron in Kingsbury, London. The family emigrated to the Federation of Rhodesia and Nyasaland a couple of years later and remained there until 1960 when they returned to London, then Jersey.

Baron was educated at Jersey College for Girls. She studied Philosophy, Politics and Economics and then law (changing subject after her first year) at St Hugh's College, Oxford. As an undergraduate she met her lifelong partner, John Pringle Nodwell Tonna, whom she did not marry until 29 January 2013 after she was diagnosed with terminal breast cancer.

== Legal career ==
=== Barrister ===
Baron was called to the Bar at Middle Temple in 1976 and became a QC in 1995. She specialised in matrimonial finance law at Queen Elizabeth Building (QEB) chambers, becoming the head of the chambers in 2000.

In 1997, she was described by The Lawyer magazine as "such a star, she is just excellent, and rated the highest. She is gutsy, thorough and very clever".

Baron represented Jacqueline Cowan in her 2001 appeal against her divorce settlement. In the initial trial, Mrs Cowan had been awarded £1.7 million of her husband's £12 million. Following the appeal, Mrs Cowan's award was increased to £3 million. The case was one of the first examples of increased protection for 'business wives'.

=== Judge ===
Baron was made a Recorder in 1999. She was created a Dame Commander of the Order of the British Empire upon her appointment as a Justice of the High Court (Family Division) in 2004.

One of Baron's notable cases as a judge is NG v KR, in which she ruled that it would be unfair to enforce a pre-nuptial contract to restrict the amount of money a husband could claim from his wealthy heiress wife. Although she recognised that the pre-nuptial agreement would have been fully enforceable in Germany (where it was signed) or France, she held that pre-nups had never been legally binding in the United Kingdom. This approach was overruled by the Supreme Court in 2010, which ruled that pre-nups could be taken into consideration in divorce proceedings.

== Death ==
Baron died on 9 December 2013, aged 61, from cancer.
