= Stocker =

Stocker may refer to:

== Surname ==
- Stocker (surname)

== Other ==
- Stocker (video game), 1984 arcade video game released by Bally
- A person who performs shelf stocking, that is, stocks shelves in a retail store or warehouse; see stock management
- Livestock fed for a short time and then sold (for example, in cattle farming, stockers are contrasted with feeders)
- A racecar in certain classes of auto racing whose origins are nominally or notionally related to factory-stock autos, such as stock car racing or super-stock drag racing

== See also ==
- Stöcker
- Stock (disambiguation)
