= Jenny Hill (journalist) =

Jersey journalist

- Born: Jersey
- Education: Cardiff School of Journalism, Media and Cultural Studies
- Occupations: Journalist, Newsreader
- Notable credit(s): Central News; BBC Channel Islands; BBC Look North; BBC Breakfast

Jenny Hill is a British news reporter and television journalist. Until the end of 2024 Hill worked for the BBC, as their Berlin correspondent, having previously worked as a reporter for BBC Breakfast and as a crime correspondent and regional reporter for the North of England region. She has also previously worked as a relief presenter on BBC Look North.

== Early life ==
Hill was born and grew up on the island of Jersey, where she attended the fee-paying Jersey College for Girls. She first became interested in journalism while working for BBC Radio Jersey.

== Journalism career ==
Following postgraduate studies at Cardiff University's School of Journalism, Hill joined Central Television in Birmingham as a reporter. When the BBC established its television news service for the Channel Islands she returned home to present the evening bulletins and to work as a reporter, presenter and producer in Jersey and Guernsey. This was followed by a move to Grimsby to work for BBC Look North for the Humber region, after which she moved to Hull, where she presented the region's breakfast bulletins.

After working in Hull she moved to the Yorkshire and North Midlands edition of the BBC's Look North, where she was a stand-in presenter and the programme's crime correspondent. In 2009 Hill became a regional reporter for the North of England on BBC Breakfast and the BBC News Channel.

Among the high-profile stories Hill worked on for Look North are the 2007 United Kingdom floods and the trial and conviction of the killer of Lesley Molseed. Nationally she has covered events including the severe winter weather of 2009–10 and 2010–11, and the murder of Joanna Yeates.

In 2011, she covered the Japanese tsunami 2011, Eurozone crisis and the 2011 London Riots.

In September 2014, she took up the position of Berlin correspondent for the BBC.. In December 2024, she announced that she was leaving the BBC.
