= Stock Spirits =

European alcohol company

Stock Spirits Group
- Company type: Privately held company
- Industry: Beverage
- Founded: 1884
- Headquarters: Warsaw, Poland
- Key people: Steven Libermann, CEO
- Revenue: circa €800 million (2024)
- Operating income: N/A
- Net income: N/A
- Total assets: N/A
- Number of employees: 1800 (2024)
- Website: stockspirits.com

Stock Spirits Group, which has its origins in a company founded in 1884 in Trieste, Austro-Hungarian Empire, is among the largest alcohol beverage companies in Europe. Since November 2022, Stock Spirits Group is owned by the private equity business, CVC Capital Partners.

== History ==
=== Camis & Stock, 1884–1906 ===
In 1884, the Jewish Lionello Stock and his partner Carlo Camis founded the steam wine distillery "Distilleria a vapore Camis & Stock". The company's main product was cognac "Medicinal", which competed with French alternatives in the Austro-Hungarian Monarchy and German Empire territory.

=== Stock, 1906–1995 ===
Camis left by 1906. By the 1920s the Stock company was one of the largest companies of its kind in Europe. In 1920, after Austro-Hungarian monarchy collapsed, Stock bought a distillery factory at Plzeň Božkov (then in Czechoslovakia). Stock eventually came to own a network of distilleries, bottling plants and ageing facilities in Italy, Austria, Poland, Hungary and Croatia. He also expanded business and established an outpost in New York City, United States. As it was considered a Jewish company, the Nazis seized assets during the Second World War.

=== Eckes & Stock, 1995–2008 ===
Stock was acquired by Eckes in 1995, creating the Eckes & Stock company.

=== Stock Spirits, 2008– ===
Oaktree Capital Management acquired Polmos Lublin in 2006 and merged it with Eckes & Stock, acquired in 2007, to create the Stock Spirits Group in 2008.

In 2009 Stock Spirits Group established its own distribution businesses in Croatia, Bosnia and Herzegovina. In 2012, the Stock Spirits Group completed acquisition of Slovak company Imperator Ltd located in Drietoma, Slovakia. In the same year Stock acquired the Novel Ferm, an ethanol manufacturing business located near Rostock in North Eastern Germany.

The company was the subject of an initial public offering in October 2013.

On 12 August 2021, Stock Spirits' board of directors accepted a £767 million takeover bid by private equity firm CVC Capital Partners, whereby shareholders would receive 377p per share. The deal was completed in November 2021.

In September 2023, Stock Spirits had completed the acquisition of the Créteil-headquartered spirits distributor, Dugas Company; the scotch whisky producer, Clan Campbell and the Bielsko-Biała-headquartered vodka distiller, Polmos Bielsko-Biała.

== Operations ==
The company has a portfolio of more than 70 brands, present in over 50 countries worldwide including the US and Canada. Company's brands include Żołądkowa Gorzka, Lubelska, Božkov, Stock 84, Limoncè, 1906, Stock Prestige, Grappa Distillerie Franciacorta, and Keglevich, an Italian brand of vodka and fruit brandies.
