= HM Prison Askham Grange =

Prison in North Yorkshire, England

Coordinates: 53.9259°N 1.1845°W

HMP Askham Grange
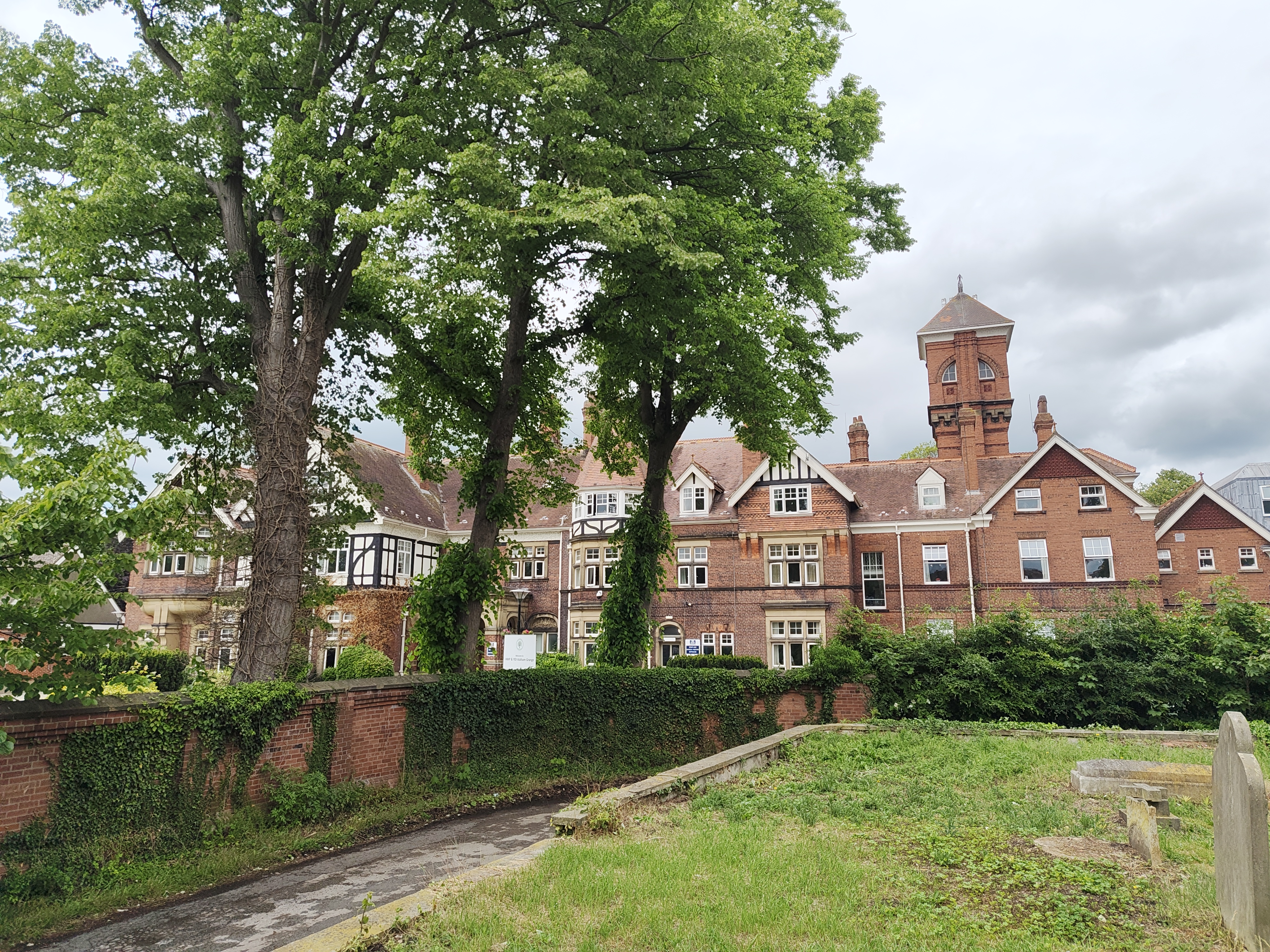
- Interactive map of HMP Askham Grange
- Location: Askham Richard, North Yorkshire
- Security class: Adult Female/Young Offenders
- Capacity: 128
- Population: 102 (December 2024)
- Opened: January 1947
- Managed by: HM Prison Services
- Governor: Jennifer Willis
- Website: Askham Grange at justice.gov.uk

HM Prison Askham Grange is a women's open category prison, located in Askham Richard village in North Yorkshire, England. The prison is run by His Majesty's Prison Service.

== History ==
H.M. Prison Askham Grange was opened in January 1947 as a women's open prison and was the first such prison in the country. The first Governor of H.M.P. Askham Grange was Anglo-Irish penal reformer Mary Size, who remained in post from January 1947 until her retirement from the prison service in September 1952.

Mrs. Joanna Kelley was Governor from October 1952 until 1959, when she moved on to become Governor of Holloway and later Assistant Director of Prisons (Women). She was replaced by Marguerite Stocker who remained until her retirement in 1966.

In 1973 Susan McCormick was appointed Governor at Askham Grange, becoming (at 28) "the youngest ever governor or warden of a women's prison in Britain." McCormick went on to introduce programmes of rehabilitation in the prison for soon-to-be released prisoners (a relatively new idea at the time).

In 1979, two inmates, Jenny Hicks and Jackie Holborough, founded the Clean Break (theatre company) at Askham Grange. Today Clean Break is a theatre, education and new writing company that works with women whose lives have been affected by the criminal justice system. The group now have links with most women's prisons in the UK.

In 1997 the prison was the subject of the documentary Witness: Babies Behind Bars shown on Channel 4.

In 2001 two inmates from Askham Grange launched a High Court battle for the right to keep their babies with them in prison beyond the age of 18 months. The challenge failed, but launched a wider debate in the media about mother's rights and their children in prison.

== The prison today ==
Askham Grange accepts adult females and female young offenders, and has space for ten mothers to maintain full-time care of their child or children whilst in custody. Inmates tend to have already served three years or more in other prisons, and are transferred to Askham Grange to complete the last part (maximum three years) of their sentence. Because of this the prison's main focus is the re-integration and re-settlement of prisoners into the community and preparation for life after prison.

Accommodation in the prison consists mainly of dormitories, though there are some single rooms. All prisoners in the Mother and Baby unit have their own rooms. The prison's education department mainly concentrates on vocational skills, and many prisoners are given work-placements outside the prison as part of their re-settlement plan.

The Prison has an external Garden Centre and Coffee Shop (The Grange Coffee Shop and Garden Centre) which is open to the general public seven days a week as well as a Conference Centre, all of which are operated by the residents to give them the skills to prepare for release.

== Notable inmates ==
- Sheree Spencer, a former prison reform manager sentenced in March 2023 to four years for a decades-long campaign of coercive control and physical assault against her husband, a case later profiled in a 2024 Channel 5 documentary.
- Tracie Andrews, convicted of murder for stabbing her fiancé Lee Harvey to death
- Mary Bell, the infamous child killer served out the last of her sentence at Askham Grange before being released in 1980.
- Helen John, a peace campaigner, was held at Askham Grange for criminal damage whilst standing against Tony Blair in the UK 2001 general election in his Sedgefield constituency
