= Tina Morpurgo =

Croatian painter (1907–1944)

- Self-portrait of Tina Morpurgo
- Born: 6 March 1907; Split, Austro-Hungarian Empire, (now Croatia)
- Died: 1 June 1944 (aged 37); Banjica concentration camp
- Cause of death: Murdered in Holocaust
- Occupation: Painter
- Relatives: Vid Morpurgo (great uncle)

Tina Morpurgo (March 6, 1907 – June 1, 1944) was a Croatian painter from Split.

Morpurgo was born on March 6, 1907, in Split to the notable Jewish Morpurgo family which originated from Maribor, Slovenia (then called Marburg). After high school she devoted herself to painting and in 1931 she held her first single exhibition, showcasing over fifty of her works in oil, tempera and drawing. In 1932, Morpurgo attended a private school in Trieste. Morpurgo planned to pursue her schooling and further artistic development in Munich, but due to the rise of Nazism and the economic crisis, she remained in her hometown, and, disillusioned, stopped painting. In 1943 she was deported to the Banjica concentration camp together with her parents. On June 1, 1944, Morpurgo was killed by Schutzstaffel members. Her paintings were saved by the surviving members of her family and friends. Later her paintings were exhibited, in 1974, at the Jewish community of Split, at the Jewish community of Belgrade, and the Jewish Historical Museum in Belgrade in 1975.

== Bibliography ==
- Kečkemet, Duško (1971). Židovi u povijesti Splita. Split: Jevrejska općina, Split.
