= Zoe Cameron =

Jersey physician and politician (born 1960)

Zoe Cameron (born 1960) is a Jersey physician and former politician. A general practitioner, she served as a Senator of Jersey from November 3, 2014 to July 12, 2016. She was the Bailiwick's only female senator during her term of office. She resigned from the States of Jersey on 12 July 2016, stating that she had "failed to keep my promises to the electorate", and referencing the inaccessibility of the Bailiwick's Council of Ministers and issues with the health department.

Cameron was born on Jersey. She was educated at St Mary's Primary School, Jersey, and at Jersey College for Girls. She then studied medicine at the University of Manchester.
