= Stecher =

Stecher is a German surname. Notable persons with that name include:

- Dino Stecher (born 1964), Swiss ice hockey player
- Edi Stecher, Austrian Righteous among the Nations
- Emma Dietz Stecher (1905–1998), American biochemist
- Jody Stecher (born 1946), American singer and musician
- Joe Stecher (1893–1974), American wrestler
- Mario Stecher (born 1977), Austrian skier
- Peter Stecher (born 1965), Austrian archer
- Reinhold Stecher (1921–2013), Austrian Catholic prelate
- Renate Stecher (born 1950), German athlete
- Tony Stecher (1889–1954), American wrestler
- Troy Stecher (born 1994), Canadian ice hockey player
- William Stecher (1869–1926), American baseball player
