= Fernet Stock =

Herbal bitters from the Czech Republic

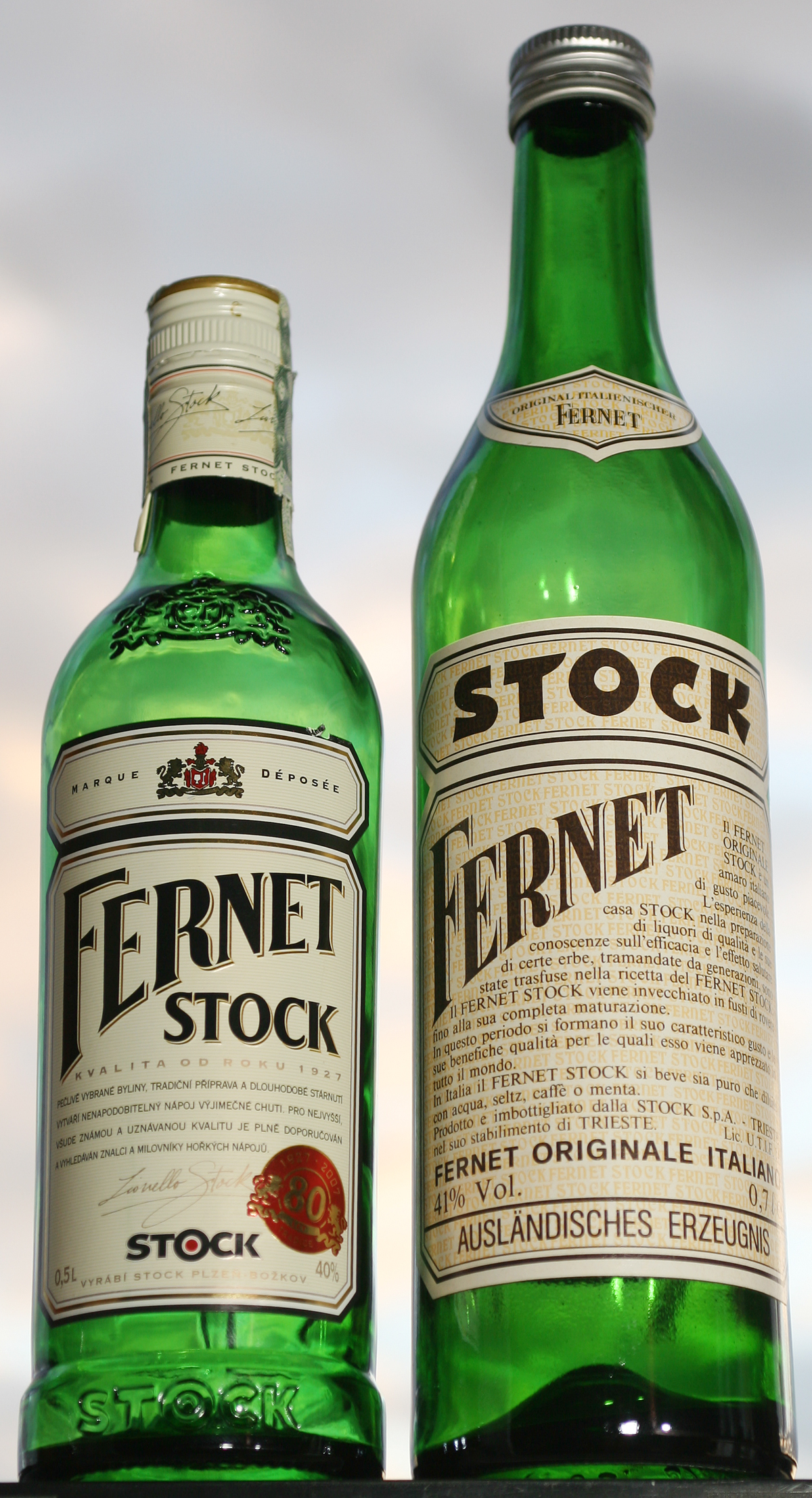
- Type: Bitters
- Manufacturer: STOCK Plzeň-Božkov s.r.o.
- Origin: Czech Republic
- Introduced: 1927
- Alcohol by volume: 38%
- Colour: Black
- Related products: Fernet Stock Citrus; Fernet Stock Hruška
- Website: www.fernetstock.cz

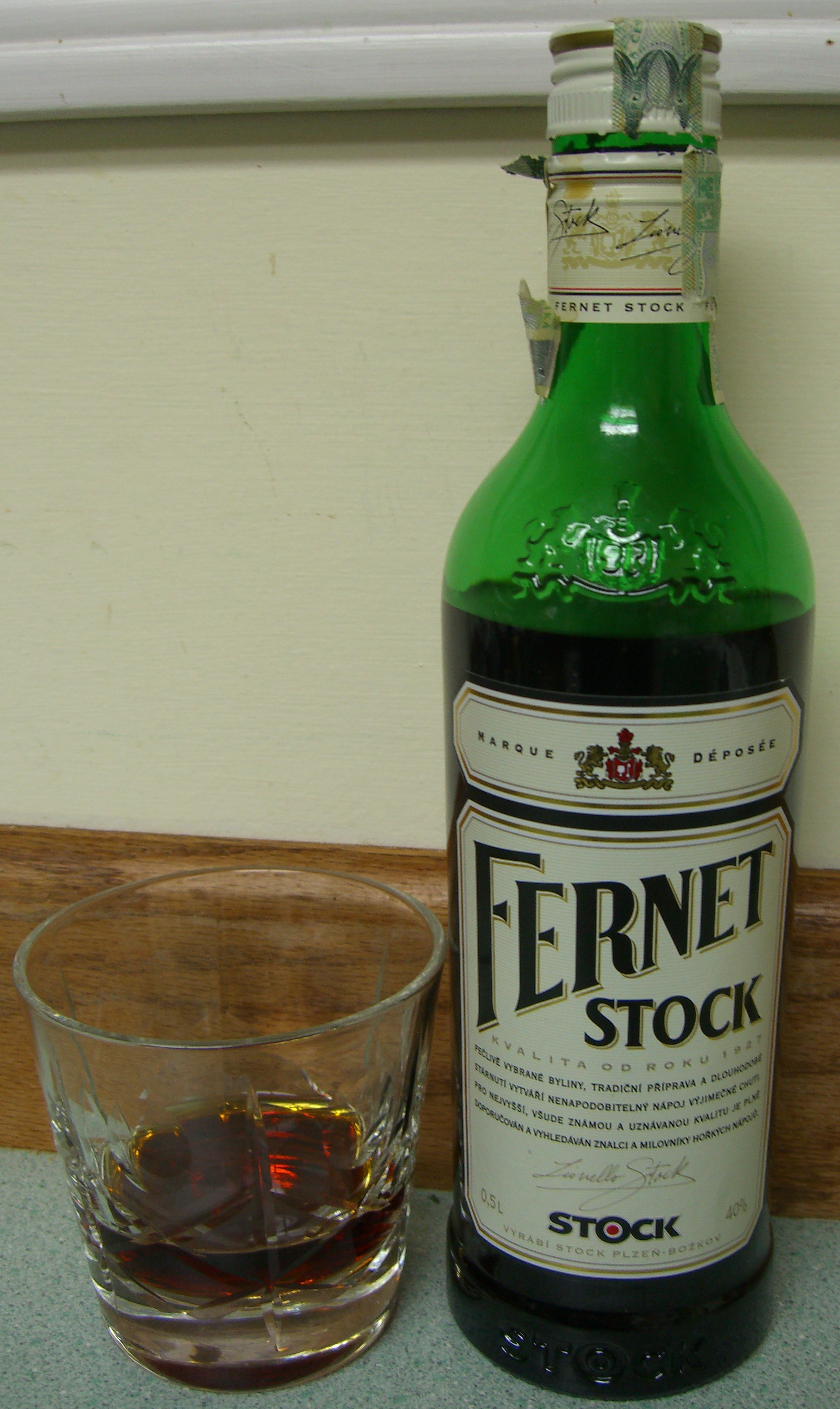
A bottle and glass of Fernet Stock

Fernet Stock is a herbal bitters made in Plzeň, Czech Republic. It is flavoured with approximately 14 herbs, imported from the Mediterranean and the Alps. It is also available in a sweeter form as Fernet Stock Citrus. The original Fernet is approximately 40% alcohol (Italian version 41%), whereas the Citrus is a lower 30%.

== History ==
=== Origins and the interwar period ===
In 1884, during the crisis caused by the Panic of 1873, Italian Lionello Stock founded the Camis & Stock company in Trieste. The Italian speaking city was at that time part of Austria-Hungary. The company's flagship product was cognac but the dissolution of Austria-Hungary in 1918 made trade between the successor countries difficult as Trieste became part of Italy. Therefore Stock bought a distillery in Božkov near Plzeň in Czechoslovakia in 1920 and founded a subsidiary called Stock Cognac Medicinal. At first, spirits transported from Trieste were bottled there. Cognac or brandy were long the firm's flagship products. The plant began gradually operating independently and shipments from Trieste came to an end.

In 1927, the Plzeň company Stock Cognac Medicinal Božkov u Plzně began with its production of a bitter liqueur Fernet Stock. It was however hit by the Great Depression in 1929 and then seized by the Nazis as Jewish property in 1939.

=== After the Second World War ===
By the end of the Second World War the company ended up as Czechoslovak national property. Although Lionello Stock regained possession briefly in 1947, it was nationalized in 1948 by the communist government. Fernet Stock's popularity only increased through the 1960s and 1970s.

=== After communism ===
The Velvet Revolution in 1989 meant the end of communist regime in Czechoslovakia and enabled the return of private ownership. In 1993, the distillery's original owner Stock Trieste became again its majority shareholder. Sales of the popular liqueurs grew by 500% in the nineties. In 1997, Stock Plzeň introduced the Fernet Stock Citrus, which over the two years became the second most popular Czech alcoholic spirit, right behind Fernet Stock.

In 2007, Stock Plzeň were sold to Tenebro, a company belonging to the US Oaktree Capital Management group. In 2012 was the production of other Stock products moved from Trieste to Plzeň. This included also vodka Keglevich Dry or brandy Stock 84. At the same time, the Stock International company in Plzeň started to serve markets in Italy, USA, Canada, Poland and 50 other countries, according to its managing director Petr Pavlík.

== Variations ==
- Fernet Stock – original first produced in 1927 in Božkov (now part of Plzeň), 40% ABV.
- Fernet Stock Citrus – launched in 1997, with lemon taste, 30% ABV.
- Fernet Stock S mátou – with mint taste, 30% ABV.
- Fernet Stock Hruška – with pear taste, 30% ABV.
- Fernet Stock Cranberry – with cranberry taste, 27% ABV.

== See also ==
- Becherovka – Herbal bitters from the Czech Republic
- Fernet – Type of amaro, a bitter, aromatic spirit
