= Stöcker =

Stöcker or Stoecker is the name of the following personalities:

- Adolf Stoecker (1835–1909), German theologist, antisemitic politician
- Dean Stoecker, American billionaire, co-founder of Alteryx
- Diana Stöcker (born 1970), German politician
- Helene Stöcker, German woman's lib activist and pacifist
- Hermann Stöcker, German footballer
- Horst Stöcker, German theoretical physicist
- Tabitha Stoecker, British skeleton racer
- Walter Stoecker (1891–1931), German politician

== See also ==
- Stocker
- Stockert
- Stecker (disambiguation)
- Stacker (disambiguation)
