= The Stockings =

- Origin: Perth, Australia
- Genres: New wave
- Years active: 1979–1982
- Labels: Rough Diamond
- Past members: Bernie Lynch; Lon Gerae

The Stockings (also known as Rip Torn & the Stockings) were a short lived Australian new wave band formed in 1979. The group's self-titled debut EP was recorded at Sweetcorn Studios in Perth. The group released one studio album, which peaked at number 93 on the Australian charts in 1981.

== Discography ==
=== Albums ===
List of studio albums, with selected details and chart positions
| Title | Details | Peak chart positions |
| Title | Details | AUS |
|---|---|---|
| Red Tango | Released: 1981; Label: Rough Diamond (RDL 8801) | 93 |

=== EPs ===
| Title | Details |
|---|---|
| The Stockings | Released: 1979; Label: Sweetcorn Studios (Mx191725) |
| Limbo | Released: 1981; Label: Rough Diamond (RDM 8803) |

=== Singles ===
List of singles, with selected chart positions
| Year | Title | Peak chart positions | Album |
| Year | Title | AUS | Album |
|---|---|---|---|
| 1981 | "(She's a) Devil" | 55 | Red Tango |
| 1981 | "Good Tango" | 99 | Red Tango |
| 1982 | "Boy Girls" | — | Red Tango |
