= Vid Morpurgo =

Dalmatian industrialist, publisher and politician (1838–1911)

- Born: 7 May 1838; Split, Austrian Empire, (now Croatia)
- Died: 31 January 1911 (aged 72); Split, Austro-Hungarian monarchy
- Occupations: Publisher, industrialist, politician
- Relatives: David-Elija and Anetta Morpurgo (parents); Tina Morpurgo (great niece)

Vid Morpurgo (1838–1911) was a Dalmatian industrialist, publisher, politician and member of a notable Split family Morpurgo.

== Early years and family ==
Morpurgo was born on 7 May 1838 in Split, Dalmatia to a well-known Jewish family of David-Elija and Anetta (née Gentili) Morpurgo. His great-great-grandfather David-Vita moved to Split in 1774 from Maribor (Ger.: Marburg), Slovenia. He chose his surname Morpurgo from the Italian version of the German Marburger (i.e. someone from Marburg). From 1846 to 1849 Morpurgo attended and finished elementary school in Split. Later he attended the Royal grammar school in Split from which he graduated in 1856.

== Political and business career ==
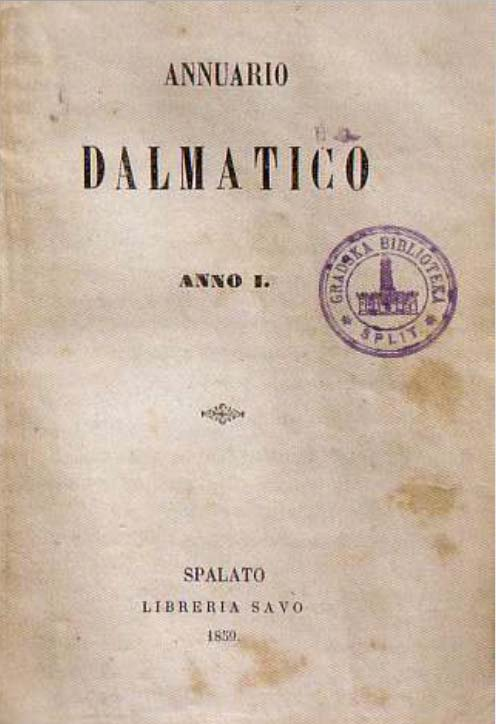
"Annuario Dalmatico" (Dalmatian Yearly) from 1859. published by Morpurgo.

After completing his education, Morpurgo was employed at the library which was co-owned by his father and his business partner Petar Savo. There Morpurgo developed bookseller activity enabling him partnership with numerous foreign publishing houses. In 1855 he traveled to Trieste, Italy to sign contracts with booksellers and publishers. In 1860 Morpurgo founded his own bookstore "Libreria Morpurgo succ. Savo" by buying out Savo's shares. In 1861 he started the first interlibrary loan in Split. In 1862 bookstore was renamed to "Libreria Morpurgo". In 1859 Morpurgo published the Annuario Dalmatico (Dalmatian Yearly) and in 1861 he published the second volume which in contrast to the first volume discussed the political problems in the country. During 1861 out of ten political publications released in Split, five were published by Morpurgo. During that time he also published the variety of commemorative books and brochures.

Morpurgo's bookstore, from the very beginning of its activity, was the headquarters of the People's Party, where young intellectuals, inspired by the ideas of the Hrvatski narodni preporod (Croatian national revival), held their meetings. Morpurgo was an informal organizer and adviser of the People's Party. Morpurgo was involved in starting the independent Croatian weekly newspaper Narodni list (People's paper). He took upon himself the administration and management of the newspaper, and also wrote the articles, mainly against the mayor Antonio Bajamonti Autonomist Party policies. Morpurgo was often targeted by the Autonomist Party supporters who repeatedly physically attacked him in the street (in July 1867, July 1868 and during the summer 1870). In 1870 Morpurgo was elected representative of the People's Party in the Diet of Dalmatia, assembly of the Kingdom of Dalmatia.

In 1875, Morpurgo founded the first steam brick factory in Split. At home and abroad he was known for his alcoholic beverages company "Morpurgo", largest distillery in Dalmatia. In 1905 Morpurgo merged with Emil Stock to found the alcoholic beverages company "Morpurgo, Stock e Comp." New company got the franchise to build the new liquor factory near Split (today part of Split). Factory concession was challenged by the municipal prefect Vicko Mihaljević due to environmental issues. Some attributed this problem to the political conflict (Mihaljević was member of the Party of Rights) between Morpurgo and municipal authorities. Due to the disappointment of failing to get the concession, Morpurgo and Stock built the factory in Rovinj, Croatia.

Morpurgo was also the elected vice president of the "Split Trade Chamber" and later its president. In 1870 Morpurgo co-founded the Prva pučka dalmatinska banka (First people's Dalmatian bank) in order to help Dalmatian farmers regain material independence from the mostly autonomist (members of the Autonomist Party) landowners, small capitalists and usurers who were lending money to farmers and during elections forced them to vote for the Autonomist Party. The bank initially operated in the Morpurgo's bookstore, as he was the first vice-president and later a president.

Vid Morpurgo bookstore in Split, 2012.

== Death and legacy ==
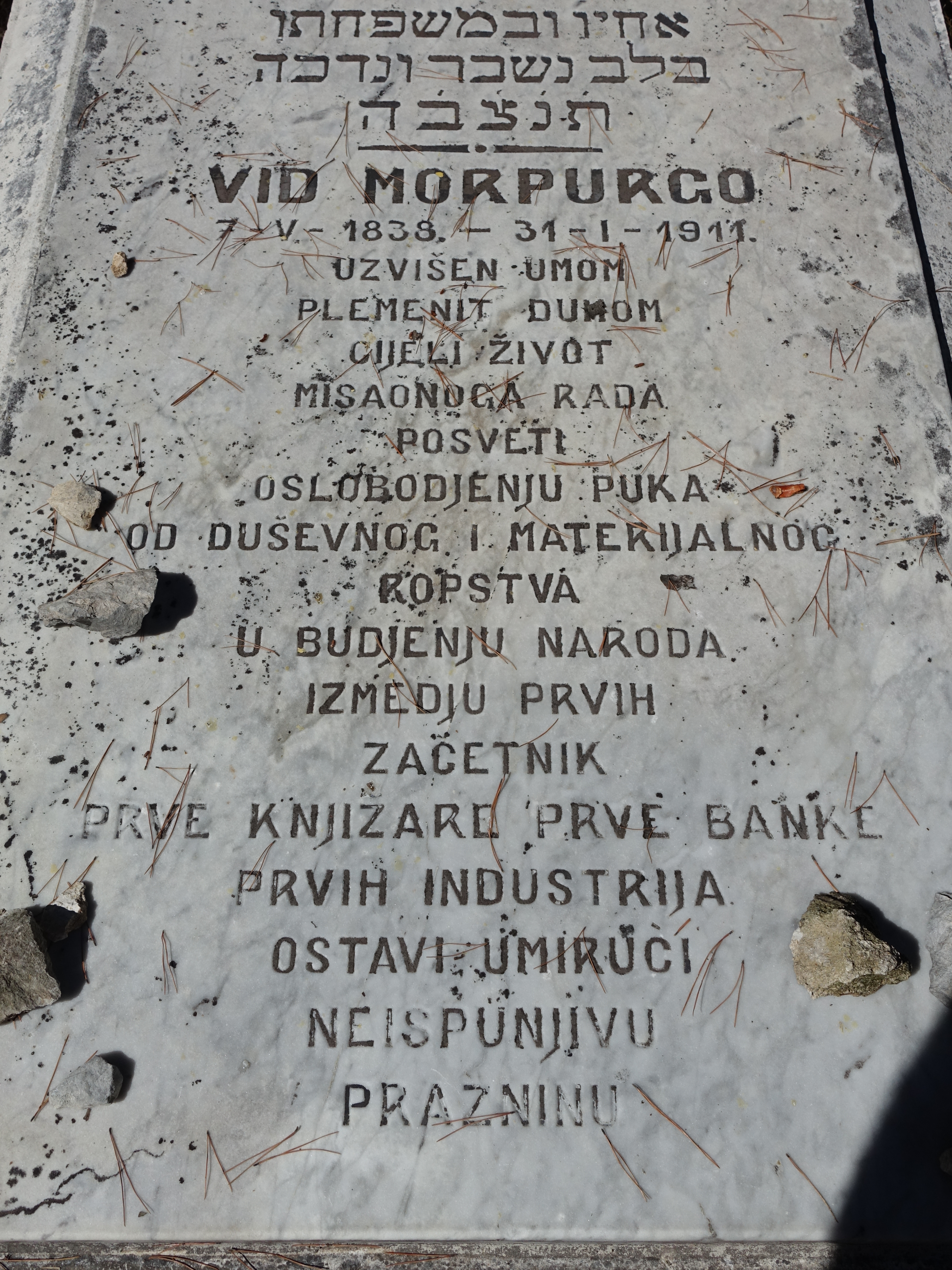
Vid Morpugo gravestone at Split's Old Jewish Cemetery.

Morpurgo died on 31 January 1911 in Split. He was buried at the Old Jewish Cemetery on Marjan hill.

Today many historians agree that Morpurgo's political ideas were aimed at the awakening of Croatian national consciousness, improving the economy of Dalmatia, education and cultural upliftment of its citizens. As a trader, bookseller, banker, publisher and columnist, Morpurgo dedicated his life to the People's Party goals.

== Bibliography ==
- Kečkemet, Duško (1963). Vid Morpurgo i narodni preporod u Splitu. Split: Izdanje Muzeja grada Splita.
- Kečkemet, Duško (1984). Hrvatski narodni preporod u Splitu. Split: Logos.
- Kečkemet, Duško (1971). Židovi u povijesti Splita. Split: Jevrejska općina, Split.
