= Edward Stocks =

English cricketer (1856–1876)

Personal information
- Full name: Edward William Stocks
- Born: 27 May 1856; Norwich, Norfolk, England
- Died: 26 October 1876 (aged 20); Norwich, Norfolk, England
- Batting: Right-handed
- Bowling: Right-arm roundarm medium

Domestic team information
- Years: Team
- 1875–1876: Cambridge University

Career statistics
Competition	First-class
Matches	4
Runs scored	18
Batting average	3.60
100s/50s	–/–
Top score	11
Balls bowled	32
Wickets	0
Bowling average	–
5 wickets in innings	–
10 wickets in match	–
Best bowling	–
Catches/stumpings	1/–
- Source: Cricinfo, 26 January 2023

Edward William Stocks (27 May 1856 – 26 October 1876) was an English cricketer and athlete who played in four first-class cricket matches for Cambridge University, two each in the seasons of 1875 and 1876. He was born and died at Norwich, Norfolk.

The son of the vice-master of the King's College Grammar School at Norwich, Stocks was educated after the death of his father at the Clergy Orphans' School, Canterbury and at St Catharine's College, Cambridge. As a cricketer, he was a right-handed lower-order batsman and a right-arm medium-pace bowler in the roundarm style. He had little success in his matches for Cambridge University, scoring just 18 runs in five innings and failing to take a wicket in eight overs, and he was not picked for the University Match against Oxford University in either of his two first-class seasons. He did, however, win a Blue in athletics in both 1875 and 1876, competing in the long jump.

Stocks' final cricket match of minor status was for Norfolk against Suffolk in August 1876, when he opened both the batting and the bowling. He died two months after this game, at the age of just 20.
