= Stucker =

Stucker is a surname. Notable people with the surname include:

- Kenny Stucker (born 1970), American football player
- Stephen Stucker (1947–1986), American actor
