= Stalker (surname) =

Stalker is a surname. Some notable individuals with the surname include:

- Bill Stalker (1948–1981), New Zealand-born actor
- Francis Marion Stalker, former faculty member at Indiana State University and namesake of Stalker Hall
- Gale H. Stalker (1889–1985), Republican member of the United States House of Representatives from New York
- John Stalker (1939–2019), British police officer, author and television personality
- John Stalker (rugby union) (1881–1931), New Zealand rugby union player
- John Stalker (footballer) (born 1959), Scottish footballer
- Meila Stalker (born 2004), Australian snowboarder
- Sarah Stalker, Democratic member of the Kentucky House of Representatives
- Scott H. Stalker (born 1975), officer of the United States Cyber Command and the National Security Agency
- Tom Stalker (born 1984), English professional boxer
- Walter Stalker (1909–1977), Australian cricketer
