= Joanna Kelley =

English prison administrator and civil servant

- Born: Joanna Elizabeth Beaden; 23 May 1910; Murree, Punjab, British India (now Punjab, Pakistan)
- Died: 2003 (aged 92–93)
- Education: Hayes Court and Girton College, Cambridge
- Known for: Prison governor and administrator

Joanna Elizabeth Kelley OBE (née Beaden; 1910 – 2003) was a British prison governor and civil servant. She led prisons in Britain, including Holloway Prison, where she changed the way prisoners were treated during and after their sentence. She was promoted from Governor to a position where she oversaw the rebuilding of Holloway Prison to allow better conditions, but those ideas were never realised.

== Life ==
Kelley was born at a hill station named Murree in what is now Pakistan where her father, Lieutenant-Colonel William Beadon, (1867–1916) commanded the 51st Sikhs. Her mother, Joanna Elizabeth Kelley (née Ballard, 1870–1958) was an artist. Her father was killed in Iraq when she was a child. She was educated in Kent at Hayes Court boarding school and Girton College, Cambridge where she read Economics.

In 1934, she married the archaeologist Harper Kelly. During the Second World War, the couple found themselves working at the Musée de l'Homme in Paris with the Germans ready to take the city. Her husband returned to the USA and she came back to Britain. At the end of the war, she was surprised to find that her husband had a new partner. She considered her marriage vows sacrosanct and she decided that she would not re-marry.

== Career ==
After her return to England, Kelley's interest turned to social work during the war. She became a YWCA youth club leader in 1939. Although she kept an academic interest in prehistory she went to work as an Admiralty welfare officer in Bath in 1942. She remained a devoted Christian. In the 1950s, she used her spare time to support Brother Edward who had started the Village Evangelists.

Meanwhile Kelley was deputy governor of HM Prison Askham Grange and Governor from 1952 until 1959, when she became Governor of Holloway. At Holloway, she ensured that long-term prisoners gained the best accommodation and they were allowed to have their own crockery, pictures and curtains. The prison created "family" groups of prisoners, group therapy and psychiatrists to support some prisoners where required.

In 1965, there was a change in responsibilities and the Probation Service was tasked with looking after prisoners once they had served their sentence. Kelley was not keen on this idea. This had previously been tackled by a group of different societies and with Kelley's encouragement, they formed themselves into the Griffins Society. The name of the society came from the statues of two griffins that had been either side of the gates as women entered Holloway.

Kelley became Assistant Director of Prisons (Women) in 1966 and the following year, she published When the Gates Shut about her time at Holloway. The same year they began to rebuild Holloway Prison. The previous design had been a "star" design where a single warder could oversee many potentially troublesome prisoners and then act promptly to alert colleagues. Kelley felt this was wrong as at the time most women prisoners were not violent. It was her ideas that inspired the redesigned prison based on her experience as governor. It was completed in 1977. During that time she had become an OBE in 1973. The new design allowed for groups of sixteen prisoners. Her ideas were in the design of the buildings but her ideas were never enacted. This was a source of disappointment but she was able to recover and adapt.

== Death and legacy ==
She died in 2003. The Chancellor of the Exchequer, George Osborne, announced in 2015 that Holloway Prison would close and would be sold for housing. Her papers are at the LSE Library. They contain the prison diary of suffragette Annie Cobden Sanderson.
