= Reinhard F. Stocker =

Swiss biologist

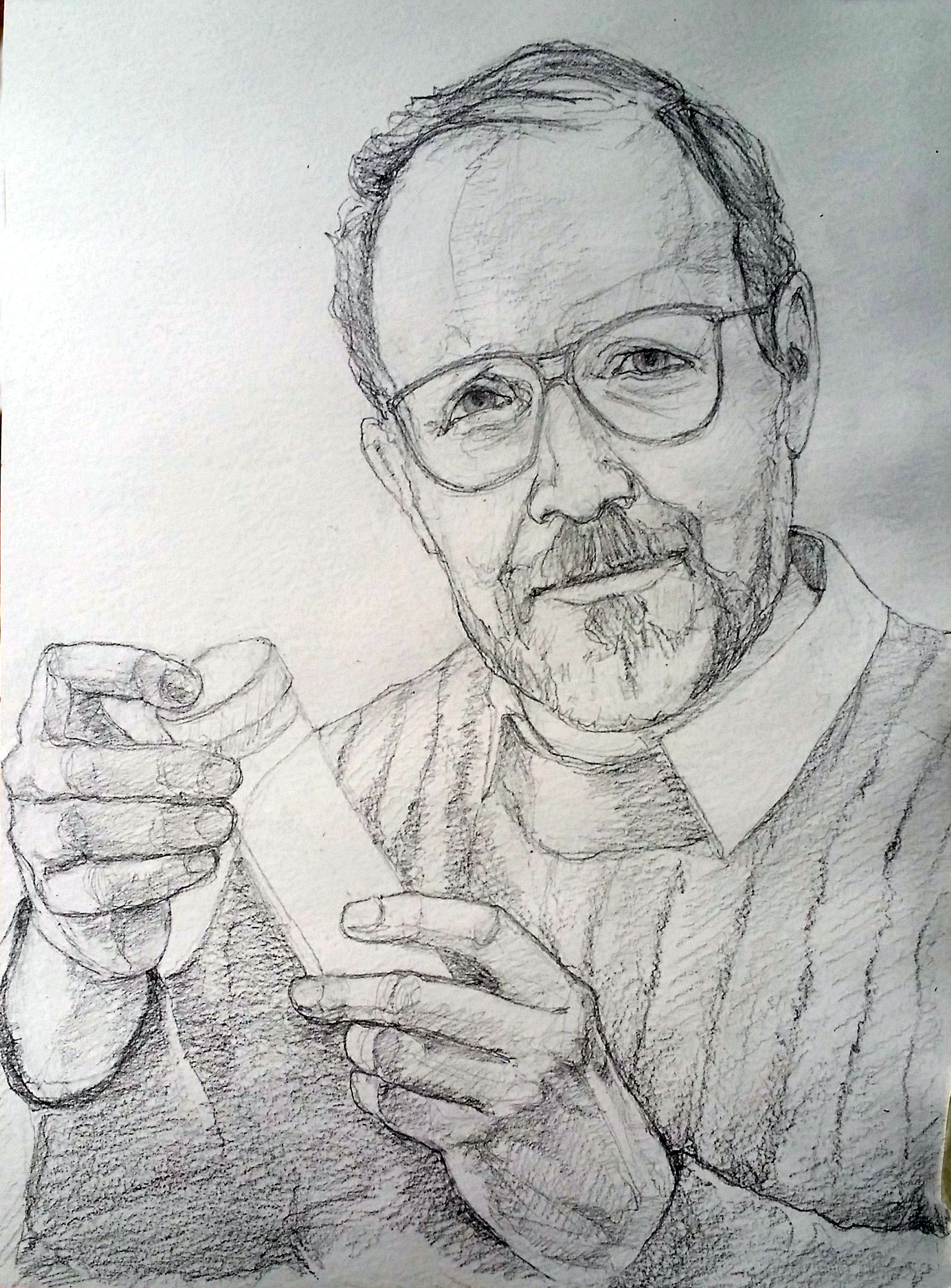
Reinhard Stocker

Reinhard F. Stocker (born 1944) is a Swiss biologist. He pioneered the analysis of the sense of smell and taste in higher animals, using the fly Drosophila melanogaster as a study case. He provided a detailed account of the anatomy and development of the olfactory system, in particular across metamorphosis, for which he received the Théodore-Ott-Prize of the Swiss Academy of Medical Sciences in 2007, and pioneered the use of larval Drosophila for the brain and behavioural sciences.

== Life, education and scientific career ==
Reinhard Felix Stocker was born on March 12, 1944, in Basel, Switzerland as the middle of three sons to Heidi and Emil Stocker, a chemist with J.R. Geigy AG, Basel. He grew up in Riehen near Basel and received his Matura in 1963 at the Realgymnasium Basel.

In 1963 Stocker enrolled as student of Zoology at the University of Basel, Switzerland. He received his PhD with the grade summa cum laude in 1972 for a thesis featuring an electron-microscopy investigation of the development of the ventral nerve cord of the ant Myrmica laevinodis during metamorphosis, supervised by Hans Nüesch. There followed two studies with Hans Nüesch, likewise using electron microscopy, on how the nerve-muscle contacts develop in pupal and early adult stages of the butterfly Antheraea polyphemus. Inspired by breakthrough insights into how genes orchestrate development in the fruit fly Drosophila melanogaster, Stocker turned his attention to the role of the Antennapedia gene in neurogenetic development. The Antennapedia gene is one of a family of homeotic genes that determine the identity of body segments. In 1971, Postlethwait and Schneiderman (Devel. Biol. 25, 606-640) had discovered that in mutants of this gene the appendages of one of the head segments develop not as an antenna, as in the wild-type fly, but as a thoracic leg. As a post-doc at the University of Washington, Seattle, USA (1974 to 1975), and mentored by John S. Edwards, Gerold Schubiger, John Palka and James W. Truman, Stocker revealed how this change in segment identity – or the surgical displacement of appendages – affects the connections of sensory neurons from the appendage towards the central brain. The developmental neurogenetics of the sensory systems in Drosophila melanogaster then emerged as Stocker's main research interest throughout his further career.

In 1976 Stocker returned to the University of Basel, and in 1978 accepted a position as post-doctoral researcher (Assistant docteur) at the Institute of Zoology (later Department of Biology) at the University of Fribourg, Switzerland, where he was tenured as post-doctoral fellow (Maître-assistant) in 1980. Summarized in his Habilitation at the University of Fribourg from 1985, Stocker's studies combined dye-filling of neurons, electron microscopy and the manipulation of the developmental fate of neurons by homeotic mutations. Adopting the Gal4-UAS method for the cell-type specific manipulation of neurons as established by Brand and Perrimon in 1993 (Development 118, 401-415), this allowed him and his co-workers to describe at unprecedented detail and completeness the first relay of the olfactory system, the antennal lobe, and how it develops during metamorphosis. These studies were instrumental to map the wiring of olfactory sensory neurons expressing different olfactory receptor genes to these glomeruli and to understand the functional significance of this wiring for the combinatorial coding of odours. They were also the basis for his promotion as Professor (Professeur associé) at the University of Fribourg in 1993, and were cited by the Swiss Academy of Medical Sciences in awarding him the Théodore-Ott-Prize in 2007.

Over the years the Stocker lab at Fribourg University provided early insight into the neurogenetic and developmental bases of chemosensation and sexual behaviour as well as into the origin of chemosensory neurons and their fate across metamorphosis. From the 1990s on, Stocker and his co-workers furthermore established larval D. melanogaster as a study case for research into the behavioural neurogenetics of chemosensation and chemosensory learning, and the central brain circuits serving these functions (see Scientific publications: 34., 39., 47., 48., 50., 51., 55.-57., 59.-78.).

Stocker's scientific interests gradually shifted from the sensory periphery towards the central nervous system and behaviour. This ‘outside-in’ approach was grounded in a precise and complete description of the anatomy and development of the neuronal systems under study. Characteristic of his work is the pioneering, early-adopting use of new methods and technology, including electron microscopy, immunohistochemistry, cell-type specific transgene expression, and the use of larval Drosophila melanogaster as a study case for the brain and behavioural sciences.

After his retirement from the University of Fribourg in 2011, Stocker published a book of fiction.

== Distinctions ==
2007: Théodore Ott Prize of the Swiss Academy of Medical Science

2008-today: Editorial board of The Journal of Comparative Neurology

== Technical collaborators and mentees ==
Technical collaborators and lab management: Martine Schorderet, Nanaë Gendre

PhD students: Markus Lienhard, Madeleine Tissot, Klemens Störtkuhl, François Python, Julien Colomb, Mareike Selcho, Dennis Pauls

Post-docs: Hans Schmid, Klemens Störtkuhl, Gertrud Heimbeck, Bertram Gerber, Ariane Ramaekers, Nicola Grillenzoni, Andreas Thum

== Congress organization and co-organization ==
2004: "Neurofly", Neuchâtel, Switzerland

2007: "Swiss Drosophila Meeting", Fribourg

2009: "Swiss Society of Neuroscience", Fribourg

2010: "Swiss Drosophila Meeting", Fribourg

2010: "Drosophila Maggot Meeting: Neural Circuits to Behavior", Bangalore, India

== Scientific publications ==
78. Stocker RF (2017) Was uns Fliegen(maden) über den Geruchssinn lehren. From: Natura Obscura – 200 Jahre Naturforschende Gesellschaft Basel, p. 193; Schwabe-Verlag, Basel; ISBN 978-3-7965-3686-1

77. Michels B, Saumweber T, Biernacki R, Thum J, Glasgow RDV, Schleyer M, Chen YC, Eschbach C, Stocker RF, Toshima N, Tanimura T, Louis M, Arias-Gil G, Gerber B (2017) Pavlovian conditioning of larval Drosophila. Front. Behav. Neurosci., 19 April 2017 https://doi.org/10.3389/fnbeh.2017.00045

76. Selcho M, Pauls D, Huser A, Stocker RF, Thum AS (2014) Characterization of the octopaminergic and tyraminergic neurons in the central brain of Drosophila larvae. J. Comp. Neurol. 522, 3485-3500. doi:10.1002/cne.23616

75. Huser A, Rohwedder A, Apostolopoulou AA, Widmann A, Pfitzenmaier JE, Maiolo EM, Selcho M, Pauls D, von Essen E, Gupta T, Sprecher SG, Birman S, Riemensperger T, Stocker RF, Thum AS (2012) The serotonergic central nervous system of the Drosophila larva: Anatomy and behavioral function. PLoS ONE 7(10): e47518. doi:10.1371/journal.pone.0047518

74. Selcho M, Pauls D, el Jundi B, Stocker RF, Thum AS (2012) The role of octopamine and tyramine in Drosophila larval locomotion. J. Comp. Neurol. 520, 3764-3785. doi:10.1002/cne.23152

73. Stocker RF (2011) 30 Jahre Drosophila als weltweit etabliertes olfaktorisches Modellsystem. Bull. Soc. Sci. Nat. Frib. 100, 42-74

72. Thum AS, Leisibach B, Gendre N, Selcho M, Stocker RF (2011) Diversity, variability, and suboesophageal connectivity of antennal lobe neurons in D. melanogaster larvae. J. Comp. Neurol. 519, 3415-3432. doi:10.1002/cne.22713

71. Pauls D, Selcho M, Gendre N, Stocker RF, Thum AS (2010) Drosophila larvae establish appetitive olfactory memories via mushroom body neurons of embryonic origin. J. Neurosci. 30, 10655-10666

70. Pauls D, Pfitzenmaier JER, Krebs-Wheaton R, Selcho M, Stocker RF, Thum AS (2010) Electric shock-induced associative olfactory learning in Drosophila larvae. Chem. Senses 35, 335-346

69. Selcho M, Pauls D, Han KA, Stocker RF, Thum AS (2009) The role of dopamine in Drosophila larval classical olfactory conditioning. PLoS ONE 4(6): e5897. doi:10.1371/journal.pone.0005897

68. Masuda-Nakagawa LM, Gendre N, O’Kane CJ, Stocker RF (2009) Localized representation of olfactory input in the mushroom bodies of Drosophila larvae. Proc. Natl. Acad. Sci. USA 106, 10314-10319

67. Gerber B, Stocker RF, Tanimura T, Thum AS (2009) Smelling, tasting, learning: Drosophila as a study case. In: "Chemosensory Systems in Mammals, Fishes, and Insects" (ed. S. Korsching & W. Meyerhof), pp. 139–185, Springer Review Series "Results and Problems in Cell Differentiation"

66. Stocker RF (2009) The olfactory pathway of adult and larval Drosophila: conservation or adaptation to stage-specific needs? Ann. N.Y. Acad. Sci. 1170, 482-486

65. Stocker RF (2008) Design of the larval chemosensory system. In: "Brain Development in Drosophila melanogaster" (ed. Gerhard M. Technau), Advances in Experimental Medicine and Biology, Vol 628. pp. 69–81. Landes Bioscience, ISBN 978-0-387-78260-7

64. Colomb J, Stocker RF (2007) Combined rather than separate pathways for hedonic and sensory aspects of taste in fly larvae? (Extra view) Fly 1, 232-234

63. Vosshall LB, Stocker RF (2007) Molecular architecture of smell and taste in Drosophila. Annu. Rev. Neurosci. 30, 505-533

62. Colomb J, Grillenzoni N, Stocker RF, Ramaekers A (2007) Complex behavioural changes after odour exposure in Drosophila larvae. Anim. Behav. 73, 587-594

61. Bader R, Colomb J, Pankratz B, Schröck A, Stocker RF, Pankratz MJ (2007) Genetic dissection of neural circuit anatomy underlying feeding behavior in Drosophila: distinct classes of hugin expressing neurons. J. Comp. Neurol. 502, 848-856

60. Colomb J, Grillenzoni N, Ramaekers A, Stocker RF (2007) Architecture of the primary taste center of Drosophila melanogaster larvae. J. Comp. Neurol. 502, 834-847

59. Grillenzoni N, de Vaux V, Meuwly J, Vuichard S, Jarman A, Holohan E, Gendre N, Stocker RF (2007) Role of proneural genes in the formation of the larval olfactory organ of Drosophila. Devel. Genes Evol. 217, 209-219

58. Krattinger A, Ramaekers A, Grillenzoni N, Gendre N, Stocker RF (2007) DmOAZ, the unique Drosophila melanogaster OAZ homologue is involved in posterior spiracle development. Devel. Genes Evol. 217, 197-208

57. Gerber B, Stocker RF (2007) The Drosophila larva as a model for studying chemosensation and chemosensory learning: a review. Chem. Senses 32, 65-89

56. Stocker RF (2006) Olfactory coding: Connecting odorant receptor expression and behavior in the Drosophila larva (Dispatch). Curr. Biol. 16, R16-R18

55. Ramaekers A, Magnenat E, Marin EC, Gendre N, Jefferis GSXE, Luo L, Stocker RF (2005) Glomerular maps without cellular redundancy at successive levels of the Drosophila larval olfactory circuit. Curr. Biol. 15, 982-992

54. Stocker RF (2004) Taste perception: Drosophila – A model of good taste (Dispatch). Curr. Biol. 14, R560-R561

53. Jefferis GSXE, Vyas RM, Berdnik D, Ramaekers A, Stocker RF, Tanaka NK, Ito K, Luo L (2004) Developmental origin of wiring specificity in the olfactory system of Drosophila. Development 131, 117-130

52. Gendre N, Lüer K, Friche S, Grillenzoni N, Ramaekers A, Technau GM, Stocker RF (2004) Integration of complex larval chemosensory organs into the adult nervous system of Drosophila. Development 131, 83-92

51. Gerber B, Scherer S, Neuser K, Michels B, Hendel T, Stocker RF, Heisenberg M (2004) Visual learning in individually assayed Drosophila larvae. J. Exp. Biol. 207, 179-188

50. Scherer S, Stocker RF, Gerber B (2003) Olfactory learning in individually assayed Drosophila larvae. Learning & Memory 10, 217-225

49. Bhalerao S, Sen A, Stocker RF, Rodrigues V (2003) Olfactory neurons expressing identified receptor genes project to subsets of glomeruli within the antennal lobe of Drosophila melanogaster. J. Neurobiol. 54, 577-592

48. Python F, Stocker RF (2002) Immunoreactivity against choline acetyltransferase, gamma-aminobutyric acid, histamine, octopamine, and serotonin in the larval chemosensory system of Drosophila melanogaster. J. Comp. Neurol. 453, 157-167

47. Python F, Stocker RF (2002) Adult-like complexity of the larval antennal lobe of D. melanogaster despite markedly low numbers of odorant receptor neurons. J. Comp. Neurol. 445, 374-387

46. Heimbeck G, Bugnon V, Gendre N, Keller A, Stocker RF (2001) A central neural circuit for experience-independent olfactory and courtship behavior in Drosophila melanogaster. Proc. Natl. Acad. Sci. USA 98, 15336-15341

45. Stocker RF (2001) Drosophila as a focus in olfactory research: mapping of olfactory sensilla by fine structure, odor specificity, odorant receptor expression and central connectivity. Micros. Res. Techn. 55, 284-296

44. Jefferis GSXE, Marin EC, Stocker RF, Luo LL (2001) Target neuron prespecification in the olfactory map of Drosophila. Nature 414, 204-208

43. Ottiger M, Soller M, Stocker RF, Kubli E (2000) Binding sites of Drosophila melanogaster sex-peptide pheromones. J. Neurobiol. 44, 57-71

42. Tissot M, Stocker RF (2000) Metamorphosis in Drosophila and other insects: the fate of neurons throughout the stages. Progr. Neurobiol. 62, 89-111

41. Balakireva M, Gendre N, Stocker RF, Ferveur JF (2000) The genetic variant Voila^{1} causes gustatory defects during Drosophila development. J. Neurosci. 20, 3425-3433 (joint first authors)

40. Stocker RF, Rodrigues V (1999) Olfactory Neurogenetics. In: B.S. Hansson (ed.) “Insect Olfaction”, Springer Verlag, Heidelberg-Berlin-New York, pp. 283–314

39. Heimbeck G, Bugnon V, Gendre N, Häberlin C, Stocker RF (1999) Smell and taste perception in D. melanogaster larva: toxin expression studies in chemosensory neurons. J. Neurosci. 19, 6599-6609

38. Laissue PP, Reiter C, Hiesinger PR, Halter S, Fischbach KF, Stocker RF (1999) Three-dimensional reconstruction of the antennal lobe in Drosophila melanogaster. J. Comp. Neurol. 405, 543-552

37. Tissot M, Gendre N, Stocker RF (1998) Drosophila P[Gal4] lines reveal persistence through metamorphosis of motor neurons involved in feeding. J. Neurobiol. 37, 237-250

36. Balakireva M, Stocker RF, Gendre N, Ferveur JF (1998) Voila: A new Drosophila courtship variant that affects the nervous system: Behavioral, neural and genetic characterization. J. Neurosci. 18, 4335-4343

35. Stocker RF, Heimbeck G, Gendre N, de Belle JS (1997) Neuroblast ablation in Drosophila P[GAL4] lines reveals origins of olfactory interneurons. J. Neurobiol. 32, 443-456

34. Tissot M, Gendre N, Hawken A, Störtkuhl KF, Stocker RF (1997) Larval chemosensory projections and invasion of adult afferents in the antennal lobe of Drosophila melanogaster. J. Neurobiol. 32, 281-297

33. Batterham P, Crew JR, Sokac A, Andrews JR, Pasquini GMF, Davies AG, Stocker RF, Benzer S, and Pollock JA (1996) Genetic analysis of the lozenge gene complex of Drosophila melanogaster: adult visual system phenotypes. J. Neurogenet. 10, 193-220

32. VijayRaghavan K, Gendre N, Stocker RF (1996) Transplanted wing and leg imaginal discs in Drosophila melanogaster demonstrate interactions between epidermis and myoblasts in muscle formation. Devel. Genes Evol. 206, 46-53

31. Stocker RF, Tissot M, Gendre N (1995) Morphogenesis and cellular proliferation pattern in the developing antennal lobe of Drosophila melanogaster. Roux's Arch. Devl. Biol. 205, 62-75

30. Ferveur JF, Störtkuhl KF, Stocker RF, Greenspan RJ (1995) Genetic feminization of brain structures and changed sexual orientation in male Drosophila melanogaster. Science 267, 902-905

29. Gendre N, Stocker RF (1994) Surface transplantation of imaginal discs for generating ectopic legs and wings on the thorax. Dros. Inf. Serv. 75, 113-114

28. Störtkuhl KF, Hofbauer A, Keller V, Gendre N, Stocker RF (1994) Analysis of immunocytochemical staining patterns in the antennal system of Drosophila melanogaster. Cell Tiss. Res. 275, 27-38

27. Stocker RF (1994) The organization of the chemosensory system in Drosophila melanogaster: a review. Cell Tiss. Res. 275, 3-26

26. Stocker RF, Gendre N, Batterham P (1993) Analysis of the antennal phenotype in the Drosophila mutant lozenge. J. Neurogenet. 9, 29-53

25. Stocker RF, Gendre N, Lienhard MC, Link B (1992) Drosophila olfaction: Structural, behavioral, developmental, and genetic approach. In: R.N. Singh (ed.) “Nervous Systems: Principles of Design and Function”, Wiley Eastern, New Delhi, pp 351–372

24. Venard R, Stocker RF (1991) Behavioral and electroantennogram analysis of olfactory stimulation in lozenge: a Drosophila mutant lacking antennal basiconic sensilla. J. Insect Behav. 4, 683-705

23. Lienhard MC, Stocker RF (1991) The development of the sensory neuron pattern in the antennal disc of wild-type and mutant (lz^{3}, ss^{a}) Drosophila melanogaster. Development 112, 1063-1075

22. Stocker RF, Lienhard MC, Borst A, Fischbach KF (1990) Neuronal architecture of the antennal lobe in Drosophila melanogaster. Cell Tiss. Res. 262, 9-34

21. Stocker RF, Gendre N (1989) Courtship behavior of Drosophila, genetically and surgically deprived of basiconic sensilla. Behav. Genet. 19, 371-385

20. Foelix RF, Stocker RF, Steinbrecht RA (1989) Fine structure of a sensory organ in the arista of Drosophila melanogaster and some other dipterans. Cell Tiss. Res. 258, 277-287

19. Stocker RF, Gendre N (1988) Peripheral and central nervous effects of lozenge^{3}, a Drosophila mutant lacking basiconic antennal sensilla. Devl. Biol. 127, 12-27

18. Pinto L, Stocker RF, Rodrigues V (1988) Anatomical and neurochemical classification of the antennal glomeruli in Drosophila melanogaster. Int. J. Insect Morphol. Embryol. 17, 335-344

17. Lienhard MC, Stocker RF (1987) Sensory projection patterns of supernumerary legs and aristae in D. melanogaster. J. Exp. Zool. 244, 187-201

16. Schmid H, Gendre N, Stocker RF (1986) Surgical generation of supernumerary appendages for studying neuronal specificity in Drosophila melanogaster. Devl. Biol. 113, 160-173

15. Stocker RF, Schorderet M (1985) Sensory projections of homoeotically transformed eyes in D. melanogaster. Dros. Inf. Serv. 61, 166-168

14. Stocker RF, Schmid H (1985) Sensory projections from dorsal and ventral appendages in Drosophila grafted to the same site are different. Experientia 41, 1607-1609

13. Stocker RF (1985) Neuronale Spezifität im sensorischen System von Drosophila melanogaster (Habilitation, University of Fribourg)

12. Stocker RF, Singh RN, Schorderet M, Siddiqi O (1983) Projection patterns of different types of antennal sensilla in the antennal glomeruli of Drosophila melanogaster. Cell Tiss. Res. 232, 237-248

11. Stocker RF (1982) Genetically displaced sensory neurons in the head of Drosophila project via different pathways into the same specific brain regions. Devl. Biol. 94, 31-40

10. Stocker RF, Schorderet M (1981) Cobalt filling of sensory projections from internal and external mouthparts in Drosophila. Cell Tiss. Res. 216, 513-523

9. Stocker RF, Lawrence PA (1981) Sensory projections from normal and homoeotically transformed antennae in Drosophila. Devl. Biol. 82, 224-237

8. Stocker RF (1979) Fine structural comparison of the antennal nerve in the homeotic mutant Antennapedia with the wild-type antennal and second leg nerves of Drosophila melanogaster. J. Morphol. 160, 209-222

7. Stocker RF, Edwards JS, Truman JW (1978) Fine structure of degenerating abdominal motor neurons after eclosion in the sphingid moth, Manduca sexta. Cell Tiss. Res. 191, 317-331

6. Stocker RF (1977) Gustatory stimulation of a homeotic mutant appendage, Antennapedia, in Drosophila melanogaster. J. Comp. Physiol. A 115, 351-361

5. Stocker RF, Edwards JS, Palka J, Schubiger G (1976) Projection of sensory neurons from a homeotic mutant appendage, Antennapedia, in Drosophila melanogaster. Devl. Biol. 52, 210-220

4. Nüesch H, Stocker RF (1975) Ultrastructural studies on neuromuscular contacts and the formation of junctions in the flight muscle of Antheraea polyphemus (Lep.). II. Changes after motor nerve section. Cell Tiss. Res. 164, 331-355

3. Stocker RF, Nüesch H (1975) Ultrastructural studies on neuromuscular contacts and the formation of junctions in the flight muscle of Antheraea polyphemus (Lep.). I. Normal adult development. Cell Tiss. Res. 159, 245-266

2. Stocker RF (1974) Elektronenmikroskopische Beobachtungen über die Fusion myogener Zellen bei Antheraea polyphemus (Lepidoptera). Experientia 30, 896-898

1. Stocker R (1974) Die Entwicklung der ventralen Ganglienkette bei der Arbeiterinnenkaste von Myrmica laevinodis Nyl. (Hym., Form.). Rev. Suisse Zool. 80, 971-1029 (Dissertation, University of Basel)

== Further publications ==
80. Stocker R (2020) Katastrophen, Krisen und kluge Köpfe – eine andere Weltgeschichte. tredition, Hamburg, ISBN 978-3-347-07071-4

79. Stocker R (2006) Immer der Nase nach. Universitas, Freiburg/ Fribourg, September, 19-21.

== Sources, interviews, and publications about RF Stocker ==
In: Fritz Müller. Vermindern, verfeinern, vermeiden. Universitas, Freiburg/ Fribourg, September 2009, p40.

Prix Théodore Ott. Unireflets, Freiburg/ Fribourg, 28. 08. 2008, p6.

Théodore-Ott-Preis 2007 für Theodor Landis und Reinhard Stocker. Schweizerische Akademie der Medizinischen Wissenschaften, SAMW Bulletin, 2007, 3, p8.

Le Prof. Reinhard Stocker reçoit le Prix Théodore Ott 2007. Unireflets, Freiburg/ Fribourg, 21. 06. 2007, p11.

In: Annemarie Schaffner. Interview mit Reinhard Stocker. Bulletin der Aargauischen Naturforschenden Gesellschaft, 2005, 2, p21-27.

In: Sonja Spreitzer. Dem Geruchssinn auf der Spur. Universitas, Freiburg/ Fribourg, März 2002, p26-27.

Verständnis für das Gehirn fördern. Freiburger Nachrichten, 16. 03. 2002.

A l’Université et à l’Hôpital cantonal, Fribourg se passionne pour le cerveau. La Liberté, 19. 03. 1999

Bourse pour une année. La Liberté, 11. 11. 1999

Erste bisexuelle Taufliegen, die ihre Veranlagung vererben können. Freiburger Nachrichten, 14. 02. 1995.

https://onlinelibrary.wiley.com/page/journal/10969861/homepage/editorialboard.html

https://www.samw.ch/en/Funding/Theodore-Ott-Prize.html
