= Joseph Stock =

Joseph Stock may refer to:

- Joseph Stock (bishop) (1740–1813), Irish Protestant churchman and writer, bishop of Killala and Achonry and afterwards bishop of Waterford and Lismore
- Joseph Stock (MP) (1789-1855), son of the above, Irish Whig politician
- Joseph Whiting Stock (1815–1855), American painter
