= Frederick Stocks senior =

English cricketer

Personal information
- Full name: Frederick Stocks
- Born: 23 May 1883; Shireoaks, Nottinghamshire, England
- Died: 2 January 1954 (aged 70); Hucknall, Nottinghamshire, England
- Batting: Unknown
- Bowling: Unknown
- Relatives: Frederick Stocks junior (son)

Domestic team information
- Years: Team
- 1906: Northamptonshire

Career statistics
Competition	First-class
Matches	2
Runs scored	24
Batting average	6.00
100s/50s	–/–
Top score	13
Balls bowled	42
Wickets	–
Bowling average	–
5 wickets in innings	–
10 wickets in match	–
Best bowling	–
Catches/stumpings	1/–
- Source: Cricinfo, 18 November 2011

Frederick Stocks (23 May 1883 – 2 January 1954) was an English cricketer. Stocks' batting and bowling styles are unknown. He was born at Shireoaks, Nottinghamshire.

Stocks made two first-class appearances for Northamptonshire in 1906 against Cambridge University and the touring West Indians. In the match against Cambridge University at Fenner's, Stocks top scored in Northamptonshire's first-innings with 13, before being dismissed by Percy May, with Northamptonshire being dismissed for 57. In their second-innings he was dismissed for 3 by Cyril Rattigan. He also bowled seven wicketless overs in Cambridge University's first-innings. In the match against the West Indians at the County Ground, he scored 2 runs in Northamptonshire's first-innings, before being dismissed by Sydney Smith. In their second-innings he scored 6 runs, before being dismissed by Richard Ollivierre.

He died at Hucknall, Nottinghamshire on 2 January 1954. His son, also called Frederick, was a first-class cricketer for Nottinghamshire from 1946 and 1957.
