= Frederick Stocks junior =

English cricketer

Frederick Stocks
Personal information
- Full name: Frederick Wilfred Stocks
- Born: 6 November 1918; Carcroft, Yorkshire, England
- Died: 23 February 1996 (aged 77); Sutton-on-Sea, Lincolnshire, England
- Batting: Left-handed
- Bowling: Right-arm medium-pace
- Role: Batsman/all-rounder
- Relatives: Father, Frederick

Domestic team information
- Years: Team
- 1946–57: Nottinghamshire
- First-class debut: 11 May 1946 Nottinghamshire v Kent
- Last First-class: 26 July 1957 Nottinghamshire v Gloucestershire

Career statistics
Competition	First-class
Matches	284
Runs scored	11397
Batting average	29.60
100s/50s	13/65
Top score	171
Balls bowled	22434
Wickets	223
Bowling average	43.91
5 wickets in innings	6
10 wickets in match	–
Best bowling	6/37
Catches/stumpings	158/–
- Source: CricketArchive, 19 November 2013

Frederick Wilfred Stocks (6 November 1918 – 23 February 1996) was an English cricketer who played first-class cricket for Nottinghamshire between 1946 and 1957. He was a left-handed middle-order batsman and a right-arm medium-pace bowler. He was born at Carcroft in Yorkshire and died at Sutton-on-Sea, Lincolnshire.

His father, also named Frederick Stocks, played two first-class cricket matches for Northamptonshire in 1906.
