= Stocking Lake (Hubbard County, Minnesota) =

Lake in the state of Minnesota, United States

- Location within Minnesota Location within the United States
- Location: Hubbard County, Minnesota
- Coordinates: 47°2′49″N 94°57′15″W

Stocking Lake is a lake in Hubbard County, in the U.S. state of Minnesota.

Stocking Lake was so named on account of its outline being in the shape of a stocking.

== See also ==
- List of lakes in Minnesota
