= Stöckli =

Traditional agricultural building in Switzerland and Germany

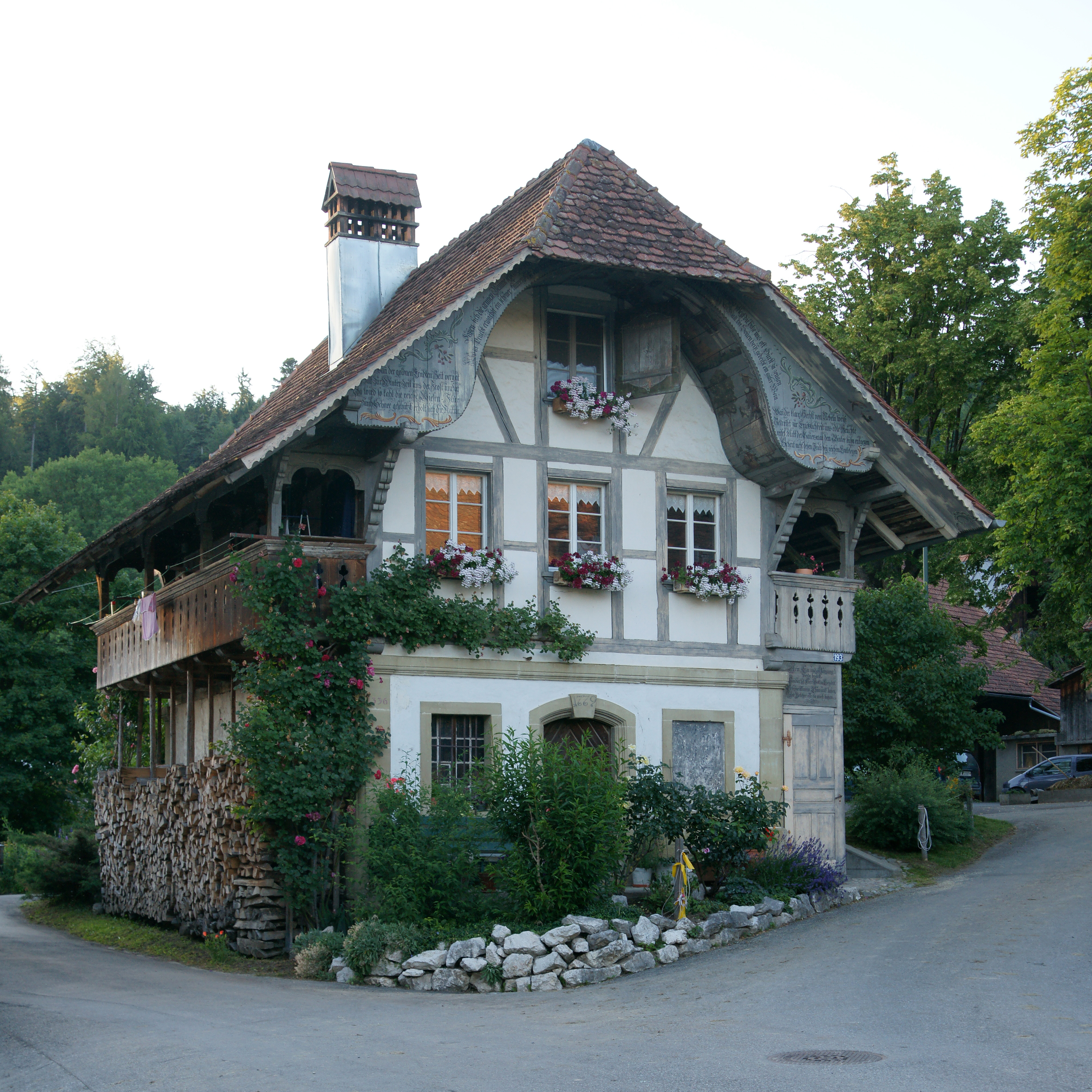
A stöckli registered as a national heritage at Hof Burren, Köniz, Switzerland

A Stöckli (Switzerland), Korbhaus, Austragshaus, Ausgeding(e)haus, Nahrungshaus or Auszugshaus (Germany) is a multifunctional agricultural building that is traditionally a part of farms in Switzerland and parts of Germany.

== Etymology ==
The Swiss German term Stöckli is a diminutive form of Stock, a term used in the Middle Ages for any stone building in the countryside. The terms used in Germany make reference to the principal function of the building as a residence for aged farmers after turning over the farm to their heirs; for example, the literal translation of Austragshaus is "retirement house".

== Construction ==
Stöcklis were generally only built on larger farms. Often, they were created through the expansion of existing buildings such as oven sheds. If newly built, they were generally provided with large cellars to store the farm's produce in, replacing separate cellar houses or field cellars. The attic was often also used as storage space for grain, while the ground floor and upper floor (if any) were residential areas.

Stöcklis in historically poorer areas tend to be simple, wooden constructions. In more prosperous areas, such as in the Swiss Plateau near Bern, they were often prestigious buildings, imitating the architecture and style of aristocratic country estates or country inns.

== See also ==
- Agriculture in Switzerland
- Dower house
- Accessory dwelling unit
- Mother-in-law unit
