= Lionello Stock =

Italian industrialist and businessman

- Born: 16 December 1866; Split, Kingdom of Dalmatia, Austrian Empire
- Died: 1948 (aged 82); Trieste, Free Territory of Trieste Zone A
- Occupations: Industrialist, businessman
- Spouse: Giorgia Grazia Jesurum
- Relatives: Abramo and Gentile Stock (parents); Emil Stock (brother)Lelio Stock (brother)

Lionello Stock (1866–1948) was an Italian industrialist, businessman and owner of the Camis & Stock company (now Fernet Stock).

== Family antecedents ==
Born in Split on 16 December 1866 to Abramo and Gentile (née Valenzin), Stock was raised with his brother Emil Stock and 10 siblings. Stock's paternal Ashkenazi Jewish family originated from Frankfurt am Main, German Empire, while his maternal Sephardi Jewish family arrived in Split during Napoleonic era. His father moved to Split in 1844 from Trieste (then in the Austrian Empire).

== Foundation and development of the Company ==
In 1884 Stock and his partner Carlo Camis founded the steam wine distillery "Distilleria a vapore Camis & Stock". His company's main product was cognac "Medicinal", which competed with French alternatives in the Austro-Hungarian monarchy and German Empire territory. By the 1920s the Stock company was one of the largest companies of its kind in Europe. In 1920, after Austro-Hungarian monarchy collapsed, Stock bought a distillery factory at Plzeň Božkov (in the then Czechoslovakia). Stock eventually came to own a network of distilleries, bottling plants and ageing facilities in Italy, Austria, Poland, Hungary and Croatia. He also expanded business and established an outpost in New York City, United States.

== WWII Nazi persecution and aftermath ==
In 1939, following the Nazi annexation, the Stock factory in Plzeň – being a Jewish business – was seized by Nazi Germany's occupation force. In later stages of World War II, Stock himself – already an old man – was persecuted along with other Jews in Trieste, but managed to survive. After Czechoslovakia's liberation in 1945, the Plzeň factory was momentarily returned to Stock and his family – but was nationalized in 1947 by the Czechoslovak Communist regime.

Stock died at Trieste in 1948.

== Bibliography ==
- Kečkemet, Duško (1971). Židovi u povijesti Splita. Split: Jevrejska općina, Split.
