= John Stocker (insurance agent) =

18th century American insurance agent

John Stocker (died 1807) was an affluent American merchant, insurance agent and alderman in the Commonwealth of Pennsylvania during the eighteenth century.

Involved in the fire insurance industry, he resided at 404 Front Street (Philadelphia) in Philadelphia in a house that has been preserved since his death. Francis Trumble's woodshop was also once located on the property.
