= Stocking Lake (Wadena County, Minnesota) =

Lake in the state of Minnesota, United States

- Location within Minnesota
- Location: Wadena County, Minnesota
- Coordinates: 46°45.75′N 95°4′W
- Type: lake

Stocking Lake is a lake in Wadena County, in the U.S. state of Minnesota.

Stocking Lake was so named on account of its outline being shaped roughly like a stocking.

== See also ==
- List of lakes in Minnesota
