= Joško Svaguša =

Croatian entrepreneur and politician

President of Hajduk Split
- In office 7 August 2009 – 22 December 2010
- Preceded by: Mate Peroš
- Succeeded by: Josip Grbić

Alderman in the Split city council
- In office 22 June 2009 – 10 April 2013
- President: Nevenka Bečić

Personal details
- Born: 11 January 1972 (age 54) Split, SR Croatia, SFR Yugoslavia
- Party: Croatian Civic Party
- Spouse(s): Jasminka Svaguša (divorced since 2011); Dajana Stojić (cohabitation)
- Children: 4

Joško Svaguša (born 11 January 1972) is a Croatian entrepreneur, former politician and former president of the Croatian football club Hajduk Split.

Svaguša graduated from the high school of tourism in Split. During the early 1990s, he went to Germany and worked in the Port of Hamburg for three years. He returned to Split in 1994 and opened a bakery with his father Mirko. The bakery was called Svaguša and after some years it became a major bakery company with stores all around Dalmatia. In 2003 Joško Svaguša bought Bobis, a major company that specialises in sweets.

Svaguša started attracting public fame in 2009 when he joined his friend Željko Kerum in an attempt to win the local elections in Split. Željko Kerum won the elections and became mayor of Split with Svaguša becoming an alderman in the Split city council.

Svaguša gained the public spotlight in August 2009 when he became the president of Hajduk Split, the biggest sporting institution in Croatia. He was put there under the orders of Željko Kerum and in November 2009, Kerum created a supervisory board in Hajduk which was made up of only his closest friends. It sparked a revolt amongst Hajduk fans who demanded democracy and transparency in the club.

Svaguša made his first move by buying Anas Sharbini and Ahmad Sharbini for a fee of 2.3 million euros which was the highest fee that Hajduk ever paid on the market for a player. He managed to get Edoardo Reja as manager which was seen as an extraordinary accomplishment.

In February 2010, Reja left Hajduk and Svaguša got Stanko Poklepović as manager. Poklepović won the 2009–10 Croatian Cup which was Hajduk's first trophy in five years. Svaguša gained controversy when it was reported that he gave himself almost 100,000 euros of the club's money as a bonus for winning the cup.

In August 2010, Hajduk managed to qualify for the 2010–11 UEFA Europa League. It was regarded as Hajduk's greatest European achievement in the last fifteen years. In October 2010, Poklepović was sacked for underperforming in the league and dropping out of the cup. Mayor Željko Kerum demanded that Goran Vučević be the new manager. Svaguša appointed Vučević but was not satisfied. Hajduk dropped out of the Europa League with five defeats and one win that season. In December 2010, Svaguša resigned as president.

While president of Hajduk Split, Svaguša faced a revolt from the Hajduk fans. In October 2009, the fans boycotted the derby against Dinamo Zagreb which was the first ever event of that kind at Hajduk. Svaguša was perceived as a person who did not understand the job at Hajduk and at times faced criminal accusations. In 2015, he was under investigation for damaging the club with changing the players contracts during his presidency.

In 2012, Joško Svaguša closed the Svaguša company and transferred all assets to Bobis. His company faced a major financial loss and in 2015, businessman Tomislav Mamić bought 50% of Bobis shares for 3 million euros. Joško Svaguša still remains the company director.

Preceded by Mate Peroš	President of Hajduk Split; August 2009 – December 2010	Succeeded by Josip Grbić
