= 2017 Split local elections =

2017 Split mayoral election
- 21 May and 4 June 2017
- Turnout: 38.07%
Candidate	Andro Krstulović Opara	Željko Kerum
Party	HDZ	HGS
Popular vote	26,642	25,553
Percentage	46.19%	44.30%
- Results of the second round in all Districts of Split: the candidate with the majority of votes in each district: Andro Krstulović Opara Željko Kerum
Mayor before election
Ivo Baldasar
The Split Party
Elected mayor
Andro Krstulović Opara
Croatian Democratic Union

Elections were held in Split, Croatia, on 21 May and 4 June 2017 for the Mayor of Split and members of the Split city council. Ivo Baldasar, the 71st mayor who served from 2013 to 2017 ran for re-election to a second four-year term, ultimately finishing in 9th place with 0.80% of the vote in the first round. As no candidate won an absolute majority of the vote in the first round, a second round of elections was held on 4 June 2017 between the two highest-ranked candidates in terms of popular vote: Željko Kerum of the Croatian Civic Party, who was previously the 70th Mayor of Split from 2009 to 2013, and Andro Krstulović Opara of the Croatian Democratic Union. Krstulović Opara narrowly won the run-off taking 46.2% of the votes against 44.3% for Kerum. Turnout was 45.5% in the first round and 38.1% in the second round.

This was the third direct election for the mayor of Split (simultaneously held with elections for all other county prefects and mayors in Croatia) since the popular vote method was introduced in 2009, as previously those officials had been elected by their county or city assemblies and councils.

== Mayoral election ==
Candidates		First round		Runoff	
Candidate	Sustaining Party	Votes	%	Votes	%
Andro Krstulović Opara	Croatian Democratic Union	17,975	26.10	26,642	46.19%
Željko Kerum	Croatian Civic Party; Fix the City-New Generation	20,937	30.40	25,553	44.30%
Marijana Puljak	Pametno	14,143	20.54		
Aida Batarelo	Social Democratic Party of Croatia; Croatian People's Party - Liberal Democrats	4,913	7.13		
Ante Čikotić	Most	4,542	6.60		
Dragan Markovina	New Left; Workers' Front	2,391	3.47		
Goran Jugović	Lista Dišpet	1,265	1.84		
Mihael Darko Burazin	Croatian Party of Rights; Croatian Growth; Family Party; Green List; Intergenerational Party of Croatia	562	0.82		
Ivo Baldasar	The Split Party	553	0.80		
Valid votes:		67,281	97.74	52.195	90.54%
Invalid votes:		1,557	2.26	5,451	9.46%
Turnout:		68,865	45.51	57,681	38.07%
Expected voters:		151,322		151,503	
The percentages of votes from each candidate are calculated from number of valid voters The percentages of valid and invalid votes are calculated from the turnout number The turnout percentage is calculated from the number of expected voters
Source: State Election Committee (Državno izborno povjerenstvo)

== Council election ==
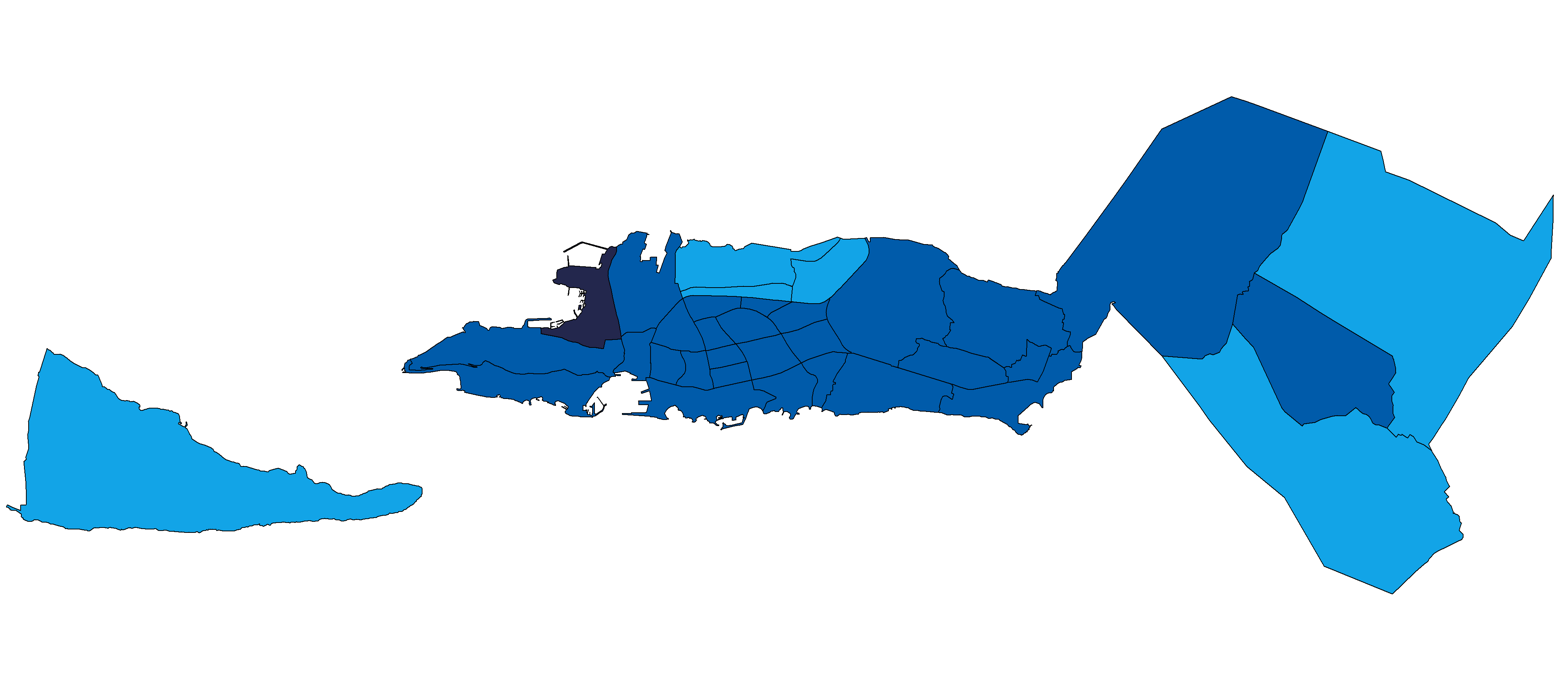
Results of the Split Council election: the party with the majority of votes in each district: Croatian Democratic Union Croatian Civic Party Pametno

Party list	Votes	%	Seats	%
Croatian Democratic Union; Croatian Social Liberal Party; Croatian Peasant Party	17,015	25.31	11	31.4
Croatian Civic Party; Fix the City-New Generation	12,905	19.20	8	22.8
Pametno	11,043	16.43	7	20.0
Most	7,290	10.84	5	14.2
Social Democratic Party of Croatia; Croatian People's Party - Liberal Democrats	7,135	10.61	4	11.4
New Left; Workers' Front	2,933	4.36	0	0
Croatian Demochristian Party; Croatian Pure Party of Rights; Croatian Conservative Party	1,895	2.61	0	0
Human Blockade; Split Party of Penzioners; Adriatic Social Democratic Party	1,516	2.25	0	0
Independent list of Goran Jugović	1,335	1.98	0	0
Croatian Party of Pensioners	852	1.26	0	0
Independent list of Ivan Bego	744	1.10	0	0
Youth Action; Pensioners Together Bloc; Dalmatian Democrats; Croatian Peasant Party of Stjepan Radić	723	1.07	0	0
Croatian Party of Rights	442	0.65	0	0
The Split Party	329	0.48	0	0
Socialist Labour Party of Croatia	226	0.33	0	0
Total:	67,209	97.66	35	
Invalid votes:	1,610	2.34		
Turnout:	68,846	45.50		
Expected voters:	151,322			
The percentages of votes from each list are calculated from number of valid voters The percentages of valid and invalid votes are calculated from the turnout number The turnout percentage is calculated from the number of expected voters
Source: State Election Committee (Državno izborno povjerenstvo)

== See also ==
- 2017 Croatian local elections
- List of mayors in Croatia
- List of mayors of Split
