= Nevenka Bečić =

Croatian politician

Member of the Split-Dalmatia County Assembly
- Incumbent
- Assumed office 19 June 2013

Member of the Croatian Parliament
- In office 22 December 2011 – 28 September 2015
- Constituency: X electoral district

President of the Split City Council
- In office 14 October 2009 – 10 April 2013
- Preceded by: Željko Jerkov
- Succeeded by: Boris Ćurković

Personal details
- Born: Nevenka Kerum; 5 March 1958 (age 68) Muć, PR Croatia, FPR Yugoslavia
- Party: Croatian Civic Party (2009–present)
- Spouse: Dalibor Bečić
- Children: 3
- Relatives: Željko Kerum (brother)
- Occupation: Politician; entrepreneur
- Profession: Economic technician

Nevenka Bečić (née Kerum; born 5 March 1958) is a Croatian entrepreneur and politician. She was president of the Split city council from 2009 to 2013 and a member of the Croatian Parliament from 2011 to 2015. She is mostly recognized as the sister of Željko Kerum and his right hand when it comes to politics and business.

== Career ==
Bečić graduated from the high school of economy in Split. She joined her brother Željko Kerum and worked on expanding his company Kerum, a major supermarket chain in Croatia. She became second in the chain of command and was credited for the company's success over the years. Her brother attracted the public spotlight with his lifestyle while she was always in the shadows.

In 2009, Kerum and Bečić decided to run in the Split local elections. Kerum won the elections and became mayor of Split. He appointed Bečić in October 2009 as the president of the Split city council.

In 2011, she and her brother Željko became candidates in the 2011 Croatian parliamentary election on the electoral list of the Croatian Democratic Union. They managed both to get in the parliament but remained in opposition to the winning Social Democratic Party.

In the 2013 Split local elections Kerum won only 18.57% of the popular vote while re-running for mayor, which did not qualify him to the second round of the elections. Also, Bečić and Kerum's Croatian Civic Party (HGS) won only 12.41% of the popular votes for the city council of Split. Bečić failed to win the 2013 county presidential elections in the Split-Dalmatia County and finished third. She managed to become a member of the Split-Dalmatia County assembly nevertheless.

In the 2015 Croatian parliamentary election, the HGS won only 2234 votes in the two Dalmatian constituencies and resulted in losing the parliament seat for Kerum and Bečić.
