= 2009 Croatian local elections =

← 2005	17 May and 31 May 2009	2013 →
Party	HDZ	SDP	Other parties
Coalition	HDZ-HSS-HSLS	SDP-HNS-HSU	Other parties
County Prefects	13	6	2
County Councillors	376	269	219
County Councillors by percentage	44%	31%	25%
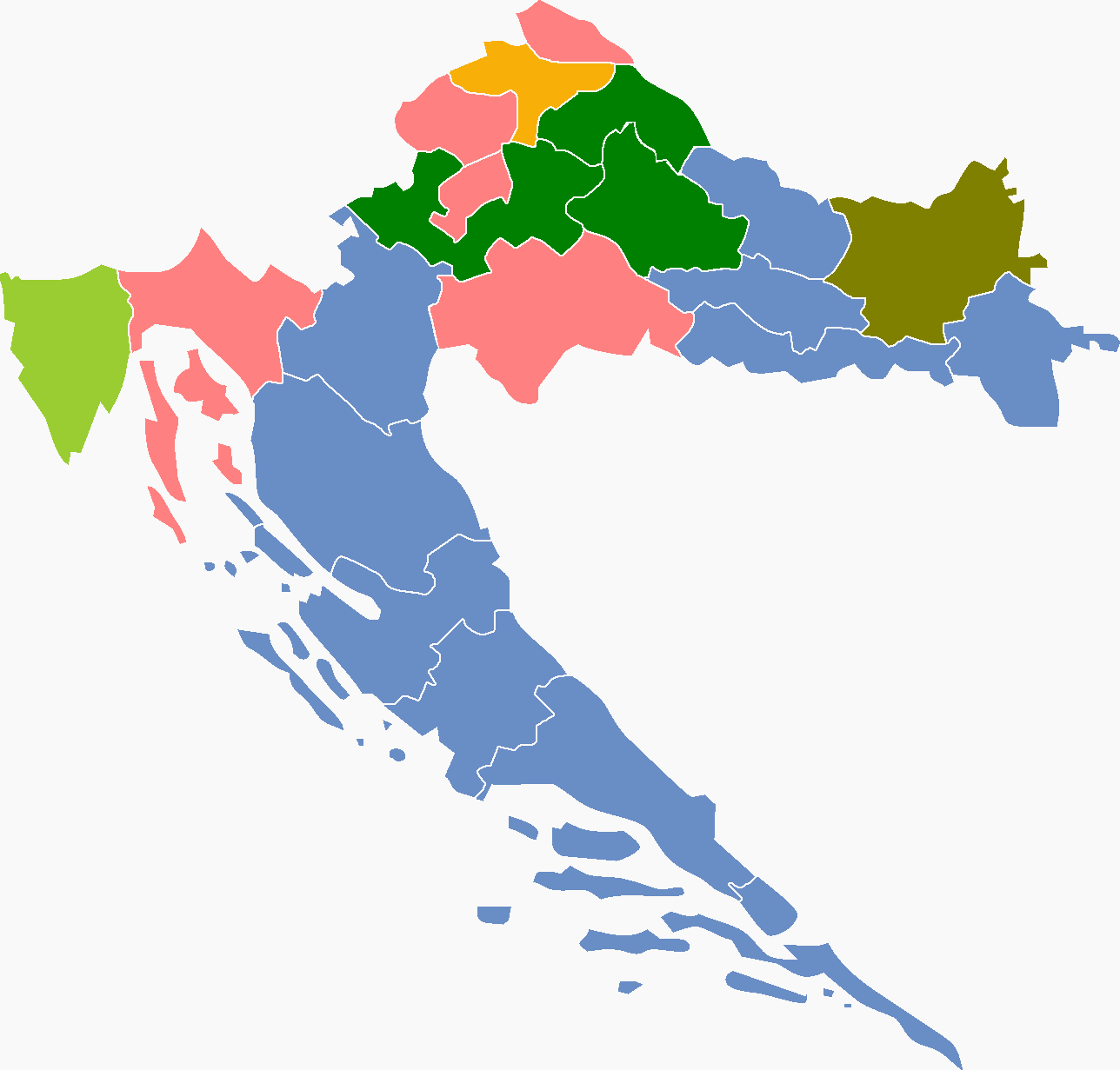
- Map of the results of the prefect elections in each county: HDZ SDP HSS HNS-LD IDS HDSSB

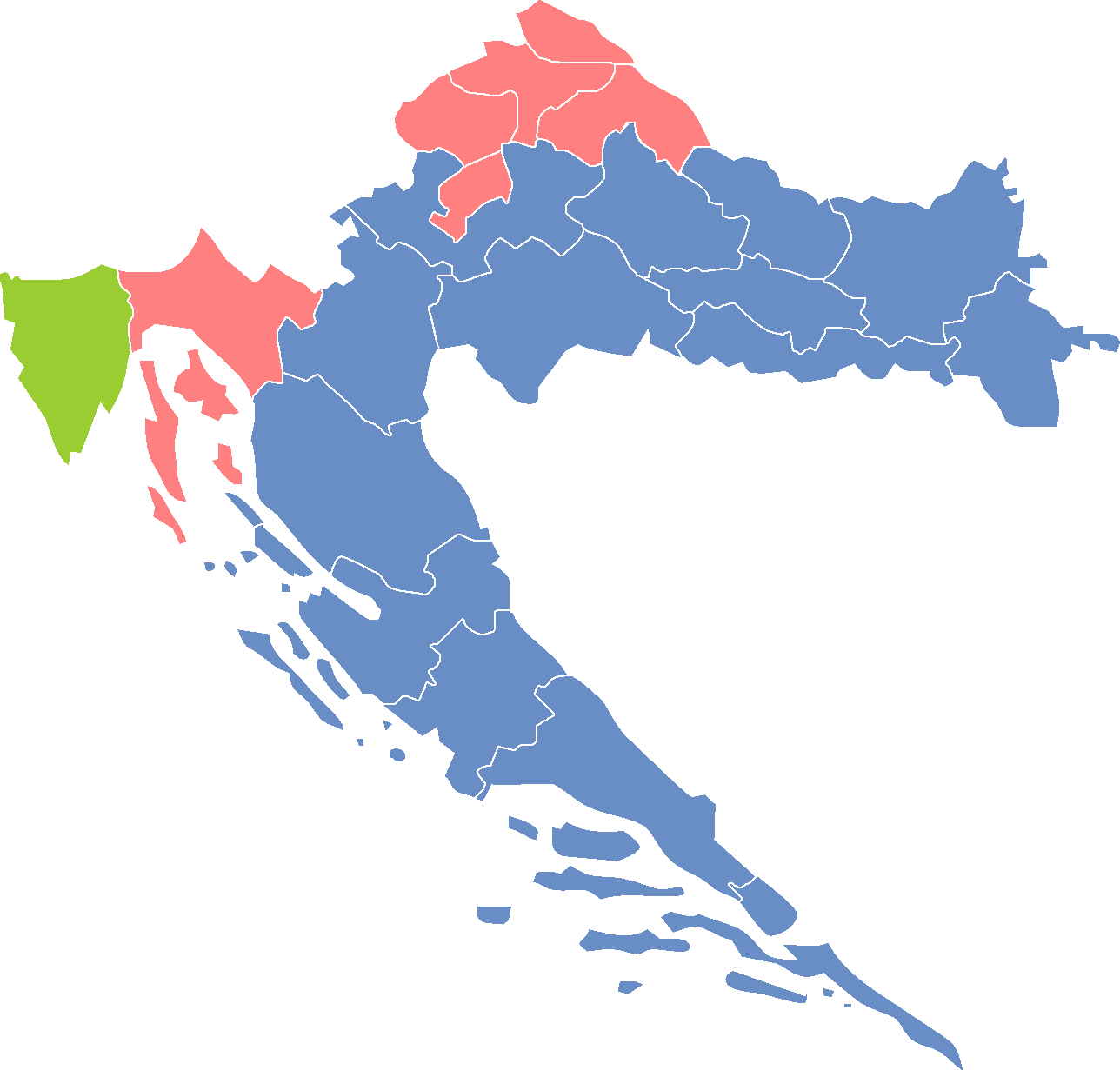
- Map of the results of the council elections in each county. The relative winners: HDZ coalition SDP coalition IDS coalition

Local elections were held in Croatia on 17 May 2009, with the second round held on 31 May where necessary.

The elections elected a total of 866 members of county assemblies and 51 members of the City Assembly of the City of Zagreb, as well as 2,206 members of city councils and 5,343 municipal councils. A total of 2,982 candidate lists with 46,324 candidates were submitted for 21 county assemblies and the City Assembly of the City of Zagreb, as well as for 126 city councils and 429 municipal councils. In addition, 429 municipal mayors and 435 deputy mayors, 126 city mayors and 194 deputy mayors, 21 prefects and 42 deputy prefects and mayor of the City of Zagreb with his deputies were elected. Kutjevo, Otok and Sveta Nedelja are cities where for the first time was elected city mayor instead municipal mayor.

== Electoral system ==
Councilors of regional and local council are elected by closed list proportional system with a number of seats depending on number of inhabitants in area. By law, municipalities with up to 3,000 inhabitants elect between 7 and 13 councilors, municipalities with between 3,000 and 10,000 councilors elect between 9 and 15 councilors, municipalities and cities with between 10,000 and 30,000 inhabitants elect between 13 and 19 councilors, cities with over 30,000 inhabitants elect between 19 and 35 councilors, while the City of Zagreb elects 51 councilors. Counties numbers between 31 and 51 councilors, regardless of population. The electoral threshold was set on 5%. The number of seats can differ from above mentioned because of special seats for national minorities that are given independently. County prefects, city and municipal mayors were elected directly by voters for the first time.

== Election results ==
=== Counties ===
Results of 2009 elections in Croatian counties
County	County council		County prefect/Zagreb mayor		
County	Plurality	Turnout	Prefect/Mayor	Turnout	Notes
Bjelovar-Bilogora	HDZ (28.92%)	44.04%	Miroslav Čačija, HSS (64.38%)	44.04%	first round win
Brod-Posavina	HDZ (32.23%)	47.81%	Danijel Marušić, HDZ (50.86%)	36.26%	runoff election
Dubrovnik-Neretva	HDZ, HSS, HSLS, HSU (46.65%)	55.41%	Nikola Dobroslavić, HDZ (53.64%)	49.14%	runoff election
Istria	IDS, HNS (44.77%)	49.63%	Ivan Jakovčić, IDS (59.62%)	38.23%	runoff election
Karlovac	HDZ, HSS, HSLS (48.25%)	46.26%	Ivan Vučić, HDZ (58.72%)	30.33%	runoff election
Koprivnica-Križevci	SDP, HNS (45.90%)	53.11%	Darko Koren, HSS (51.18%)	53.10%	first round win
Krapina-Zagorje	SDP, HNS, ZDS, HSU, DC (46.25%)	52.66%	Siniša Hajdaš Dončić, SDP (53.03%)	52.66%	first round win
Lika-Senj	HDZ, HSS, HSP, HSLS (69.87%)	50.54%	Milan Jurković, HDZ (68.49%)	50.54%	first round win
Međimurje	SDP, HSS, HSU (40.03%)	50.16%	Ivan Perhoč, SDP (62.82%)	37.32%	runoff election
Osijek-Baranja	HDZ, HSP, HSU, HSS, HSLS (34.69%)	49.20%	Vladimir Šišljagić, HDSSB (54.10%)	38.69%	runoff election
Požega-Slavonia	HDZ (40.41%)	49.91%	Marijan Aladrović, HDZ (53.00%)	43.72%	runoff election
Primorje-Gorski Kotar	SDP, HNS, HSU, IDS, HSLS, ARS, SDA, ZS (52.25%)	44.07%	Zlatko Komadina, SDP (60.48%)	44.07%	first round win
Sisak-Moslavina	HDZ, HSS, HSLS, HSU (40.09%)	44.41%	Marina Lovrić, SDP (50.90%)	44.41%	first round win
Split-Dalmatia	HDZ, HSS, HSLS (31.72%)	49.29%	Ante Sanader, HDZ (58.65%)	42.75%	runoff election
Šibenik-Knin	HDZ (35.63%)	46.76%	Goran Pauk, HDZ (62.70%)	30.20%	runoff election
Varaždin	HNS, SDP, HSU (52.92%)	57.69%	Predrag Štromar, HNS (51.56%)	57.69%	first round win
Virovitica-Podravina	HDZ, HSS, HSLS (53.67%)	50.05%	Tomislav Tolušić, HDZ (57.08%)	50.05%	first round win
Vukovar-Syrmia	HDZ, HSS, HSP, HSLS, HSU, PSS (59.57%)	43.20%	Božo Galić, HDZ (67.85%)	43.24%	first round win
Zadar	HDZ, HSS, HSLS, HSP, HSU (63.30%)	44.76%	Stipe Zrilić, HDZ (62.92%)	44.82%	first round win
Zagreb County	HDZ, HSS, HSU (42.25%)	45.80%	Stjepan Kožić, HSS (51.06%)	45.80%	first round win
City of Zagreb	SDP, HSU (33.34%)	41.69%	Milan Bandić, SDP (61.84%)	33.62%	runoff election
Source: State Electoral Committee

=== Cities ===
Results of 2009 elections in Croatian cities
	City Council		Mayor		
City	Plurality	Turnout	Mayor	Turnout	Note
Bakar	HDZ (49.24%)	51.44%	Tomislav Klarić, HDZ (69.60%)	51.43%	first round win
Beli Manastir	HDZ, HSP, HSS, HSU (46.41%)	38.33%	Ivan Doboš, SDP (49.24%)	39.79%	runoff election
Belišće	HDSSB (31.87%)	51.81%	Zvonko Borić, HSU (60.75%)	47.82%	runoff election
Benkovac	HDZ (56.37%)	35.93%	Željko Katuša, HDZ (61.08%)	35.93%	first round win
Biograd na Moru	HDZ (58.37%)	50.56%	Ivan Knez, HDZ (68.32%)	50.55%	first round win
Bjelovar	SDP, HNS (30.37%)	35.10%	Antun Korušec, HSLS (57.07%)	35.10%	first round win
Buje	IDS (21.05%)	47.98%	Edi Andreašić, IDS (56.80%)	45.14%	runoff election
Buzet	IDS (60.61%)	59.91%	Valter Flego, IDS (83.02%)	59.91%	first round win
Cres	HNS, SDP, PGS, HSLS (40.83%)	58.25%	Kristijan Jurjanko, HNS (58.86%)	61.39%	runoff election
Crikvenica	SDP, HSLS (25.05%)	38.84%	Damir Rukavina, HDZ (50.41%)	30.04%	runoff election
Čabar	HDZ (33.50%)	58.37%	Željko Erent, HDZ (59.97%)	54.07%	runoff election
Čakovec	SDP, HSS, HSU (50.42%)	49.31%	Branko Šalamon, SDP (50.41%)	49.32%	first round win
Čazma	HSS, HSU (45.86%)	50.54%	Dinko Pirak, HSS (59.62%)	50.54%	first round win
Daruvar	HSS (26.91%)	45.77%	Dalibor Rohlik, SDP (59.01%)	42.22%	runoff election
Delnice	PGS (34.21%)	52.43%	Marijan Pleše, PGS (55.67%)	45.04%	runoff election
Donja Stubica	HDZ (35.47%)	48.84%	Juraj Srebačić, HDZ (63.15%)	37.86%	runoff election
Donji Miholjac	HDZ (36.85%)	47.92%	Stjepan Viduka, HDZ (58.92%)	41.50%	runoff election
Drniš	HDZ (34.74%)	50.91%	Ante Dželalija, Ind. (51.20%)	47.21%	runoff election
Dubrovnik	HDZ, HSS (39.95%)	48.66%	Andro Vlahušić, SDP (53.91%)	55.08%	runoff election
Duga Resa	HSS (24.80%)	50.30%	Ivan Baršić, HSS (51.22%)	50.33%	first round win
Dugo Selo	HDZ, HSS (37.61%)	35.29%	Vlado Kruhak, HDZ (68.86%)	30.12%	runoff election
Đakovo	SDP, HNS, HDSSB (48.01%)	53.66%	Zoran Vinković, SDP (53.96%)	53.66%	first round win
Đurđevac	HDZ, HSLS (41.88%)	60.40%	Slavko Gračan, SDP (52.76%)	63.65%	runoff election
Garešnica	SDP, HNS (38.09%)	45.29%	Velimir Žunac, HDZ (52.04%)	52.47%	runoff election
Glina	HDZ, HSP, HSU (44.51%)	39.81%	Milan Bakšić, HNS (54,50%)	39.81%	first round win
Gospić	HDZ, HSS, HSP, HSLS (82.59%)	44.42%	Milan Kolić, HDZ (78.10%)	44.42%	first round win
Grubišno Polje	HDZ, HSLS (55.04%)	43.94%	Zlatko Mađeruh, HDZ (58.68%)	43.97%	first round win
Hrvatska Kostajnica	HDZ, HSP (47.00%)	42.85%	Tomislav Paunović, HSLS (49.16%)	41.80%	runoff election
Hvar	Ind. (35.19%)	55.81%	Pjerino Bebić, Ind. (62.66%)	50.39%	runoff election
Ilok	HDZ, HSP, HSU (46.70%)	53.24%	Miroslav Janić, HDZ (50.45%)	58.38%	runoff election
Imotski	HSP, HČSP (56.43%)	57.27%	Ante Đuzel, HSP (74.39%)	57.27%	first round win
Ivanec	HNS, HSU (46.95%)	56.69%	Milorad Batinić, HNS (65.03%)	56.69%	first round win
Ivanić-Grad	SDP, HNS, HSLS (48.68%)	40.33%	Borislav Kovačić, SDP (53,87%)	40.33%	first round win
Jastrebarsko	SDP, HNS, HSU (49.00%)	62.49%	Mihael Zmajlović, SDP (50.46%)	62.49%	first round win
Karlovac	HDZ, HSS, HSLS (47.49%)	44.96%	Damir Jelić, HDZ (55.09%)	44.97%	first round win
Kastav	SDP, HNS, IDS (46.10%)	39.95%	Ivica Lukanović, SDP (53.95%)	39.95%	first round win
Kaštela	HDZ, HSLS (33.41%)	40.58%	Josip Berket, Ind. (50.13%)	43.44%	runoff election
Klanjec	SDP, ZDS, HNS (50.27%)	64.92%	Zlatko Brlek, SDP (65.14%)	64.92%	first round win
Knin	HDZ (48.69%)	37.15%	Josipa Rimac, HDZ (63.87%)	37.15%	first round win
Komiža	SDP, HNS (35.78%)	55.25%	Tonka Ivčević, SDP (56.96%)	56.56%	runoff election
Koprivnica	SDP, HNS (66.44%)	55.73%	Zvonimir Mršić, SDP (73.95%)	55.66%	first round win
Korčula	SDP, HNS (34.10%)	54.66%	Mirko Duhović, SDP (49.14%)	53.51%	runoff election
Kraljevica	HDZ, HSP, HSS (32.70%)	49.17%	Josip Turina, SDP (55.66%)	45.23%	runoff election
Krapina	HDZ (41.96%)	55.98%	Josip Horvat, HDZ (51.64%)	55.99%	first round win
Križevci	SDP, HNS (35.60%)	45.46%	Branko Hrg, HSS (53.28%)	45.69%	first round win
Krk	PGS, SDP, HSLS (50.55%)	47.07%	Darijo Vasilić, PGS (77.52%)	47.07%	first round win
Kutina	HDZ, HSLS, HSP, HSS, HSU (56.75%)	43.56%	Davor Žmegač, HDZ (70.02%)	43.56%	first round win
Kutjevo	HDZ (27.75%)	51.28%	Ivica Nikolić, SDP (54.09%)	49.57%	runoff election
Labin	IDS (45.22%)	46.34%	Tulio Demetlika, IDS (57.87%)	46.33%	first round win
Lepoglava	HNS, HSU, SDP (59.88%)	48.25%	Marijan Škvarić, HNS (69.59%)	48.25%	first round win
Lipik	HDZ (31.71%)	36.09%	Antun Haramija, HDZ (59.94%)	33.95%	runoff election
Ludbreg	SDP (21.94%)	55.26%	Marijan Krobot, SDP (51.33%)	44.42%	runoff election
Makarska	HDZ (38.68%)	41.08%	Marko Ožić-Bebek, HDZ (57.87%)	41.39%	runoff election
Mali Lošinj	HDZ, HSLS, HSS, HKDU (41.45%)	51.27%	Gari Cappelli, HDZ (58.05%)	51.28%	first round win
Metković	HSS, HSLS, HNS, HSU, SU (50.30%)	62.60%	Stipo Gabrić, HSS (54.31%)	62.60%	first round win
Mursko Središće	SDP, HNS (30.08%)	39.94%	Josip Dobranić, HSLS (60.81%)	33.60%	runoff election
Našice	HDZ, HSP (43.11%)	56.66%	Krešimir Žagar, HDZ (56.50%)	56.66%	first round win
Nin	HDZ (47.20%)	52.37%	Emil Ćurko, HDZ (59.63%)	52.37%	first round win
Nova Gradiška	SDP (31.87%)	45.28%	Josip Vuković, SDP (58.20%)	41.00%	runoff election
Novalja	HDZ, HSS, HSLS (63.15%)	65.65%	Ivan Dabo, HDZ (63.29%)	65.65%	first round win
Novi Marof	HNS (40.24%)	63.50%	Darko Hrenić, HNS (54.04%)	63.50%	first round win
Novi Vinodolski	HDZ (58.43%)	60.56%	Oleg Butković, HDZ (72.50%)	60.56%	first round win
Novigrad	IDS (54.36%)	50.98%	Anteo Milos, IDS (61.60%)	50.98%	first round win
Novska	HDZ, HSS (40.09%)	42.04%	Antun Vidaković, HDZ (53,38%)	38.61%	runoff election
Obrovac	HDZ (28.90%)	44.88%	Ante Župan, HDZ (55.83%)	44.02%	runoff election
Ogulin	HDZ (45.99%)	51.13%	Nikola Magdić, HDZ (56.68%)	43.63%	runoff election
Omiš	HDZ (52.52%)	48.82%	Ivan Škaričić, HDZ (51.33%)	48.42%	first round win
Opatija	SDP, HNS, HSLS (30.50%)	47.40%	Ivo Dujmić, SDP (56.33%)	39.66%	runoff election
Opuzen	HDZ, HSLS (46.12%)	66.91%	Ivo Mihaljević, Ind. (61.49%)	66.87%	runoff election
Orahovica	HDZ, HSLS (60.61%)	60.17%	Josip Nemec, HDZ (61.86%)	60.08%	first round win
Oroslavje	SDP, HNS, HSU, ZDS (52.26%)	43.82%	Ivan Tuđa, SDP (75.51%)	43.82%	single-candidate election
Osijek	HDSSB, HNS, Zeleni HR (32.66%)	45.87%	Krešimir Bubalo, HDSSB (63.14%)	38.93%	runoff election
Otočac	HDZ, HSP, HSLS, HNS (66.99%)	53.13%	Mario Barković, HDZ (67.64%)	53.13%	first round win
Otok	HDZ, HSS (62.98%)	54.52%	Josip Šarić, HDZ (66.87%)	54.51%	first round win
Ozalj	SDP, HNS (44.89%)	43.86%	Biserka Vranić, SDP (50.03%)	43.86%	first round win
Pag	HSP, HSLS (23.68%)	68.06%	Ante Fabijanić-Njekulin, HSP (57.09%)	64.18%	runoff election
Pakrac	HDZ (41.86%)	33.23%	Davor Hruška, HDZ (65.65%)	29.97%	runoff election
Pazin	IDS (45.36%)	50.62%	Renato Krulčić, IDS (52.76%)	50.62%	first round win
Petrinja	HDZ, HSP, HSS (36.62%)	43.32%	Željko Nenadić, HDZ (50.04%)	39.83%	runoff election
Pleternica	HDZ, HSS, HSP (51.98%)	58.95%	Franjo Lucić, HDZ (65.63%)	58.97%	first round win
Ploče	HDZ, HSLS (38.05%)	55.59%	Krešimir Vejić, HDZ (52.35%)	58.46%	runoff election
Poreč	IDS (51.97%)	43.98%	Edi Štifanić, IDS (68.87%)	43.98%	first round win
Požega	SDP (51.48%)	54.96%	Zdravko Ronko, SDP (52.33%)	54.96%	first round win
Pregrada	HDZ, HSS, HNS, HSU, ZDS (54.55%)	44.90%	Vilmica Kapac, HDZ (71.98%)	44.90%	first round win
Prelog	HNS (39.78%)	52.83%	Dragutin Glavina, HNS (68.32%)	52.83%	first round win
Pula	IDS, SDP (44.38%)	43.07%	Boris Miletić, IDS (57.91%)	43.07%	first round win
Rab	HDZ, HSS, RPS (38.85%)	57.98%	Zdenko Antešić, SDP (48.93%)	57.26%	runoff election
Rijeka	SDP, HNS, IDS, HSLS, HSS, ARS, SDA (48.77%)	36.85%	Vojko Obersnel, SDP (58.27%)	36.85%	first round win
Rovinj	IDS (61.51%)	48.43%	Giovanni Sponza, IDS (71.88%)	48.43%	first round win
Samobor	HDZ, HSP, HSU (22.10%)	47.23%	Krešo Beljak, HSS (59,99%)	34.57%	runoff election
Senj	HDZ, HSS (44.53%)	56.45%	Darko Nekić, HDZ (58.72%)	56.45%	first round win
Sinj	HDZ, HSS (32.53%)	49.91%	Ivica Glavan, HDZ (54.05%)	47.63%	runoff election
Sisak	SDP, HNS, DSU, DC, SDSS (37.53%)	48.77%	Dinko Pintarić, HDZ (49.65%)	44.18%	runoff election
Skradin	HDZ, HSS (56.20%)	40.49%	Nediljko Dujić, HDZ (62.20%)	40.51%	first round win
Slatina	HDZ, HSU (43.45%)	40.14%	Ivan Roštaš, HDZ (55.96%)	40.20%	first round win
Slavonski Brod	HSP (40.70%)	43.95%	Mirko Duspara, HSP (50.59%)	43.95%	first round win
Slunj	HDZ (61.89%)	35.01%	Ivan Bogović, HDZ (58.67%)	35.01%	first round win
Solin	HDZ, HSLS, HSS (47.19%)	45.01%	Blaženko Boban, HDZ (60.94%)	45.02%	first round win
Split	Ind. (27.71%)	46.76%	Željko Kerum, Ind. (56.87%)	44.28%	runoff election
Stari Grad	HDZ (28.76%)	59.63%	Đurđica Plančić, SDP (57.18%)	59.02%	runoff election
Supetar	SDP, HNS (35.69%)	54.05%	Dinko Hržić, HDZ (51.40%)	50.17%	runoff election
Sveta Nedelja	HDZ, HSS (44.45%)	39.61%	Drago Prahin, HDZ (53.58%)	32.36%	runoff election
Sveti Ivan Zelina	HDZ (39.43%)	47.15%	Vlado Žigrović, HDZ (60.75%)	47.15%	first round win
Šibenik	HDZ, HSS, HSLS, DC (34.11%)	47.64%	Ante Županović, SDP (50.84%)	42.35%	runoff election
Trilj	HDZ, HSLS (46.74%)	50.52%	Ivan Šipić, HDZ (51.44%)	50.52%	first round win
Trogir	SDP, HNS, HSU (42.84%)	52.89%	Damir Rilje, SDP (57.68%)	54.04%	runoff election
Umag	IDS (28.88%)	42.60%	Vili Bassanese, Ind (52.50%)	37.23%	runoff election
Valpovo	HDZ, HSS (43.55%)	55.78%	Leon Žulj, HDZ (55.65%)	55.78%	first round win
Varaždin	HNS, SDP, SHUS (40.39%)	53.68%	Ivan Čehok, HNS (50.55%)	53.68%	first round win
Varaždinske Toplice	HSLS (34.66%)	68.26%	Dragutin Kranjčec, HSLS (56.66%)	66.79%	runoff election
Velika Gorica	HDZ, HSS, HSP, HSU (49.19%)	43.09%	Dražen Barišić, HDZ (55.01%)	42.07%	runoff election
Vinkovci	HDZ, HSP, HSLS, HSS, HSU (52.51%)	41.23%	Mladen Karlić, HDZ (56.79%)	41.27%	first round win
Virovitica	HDZ, HSS, HSLS (51.11%)	52.60%	Ivica Kirin, HDZ (56.00%)	52.60%	first round win
Vis	HNS, HSS (34.87%)	59.08%	Ivo Radica, HDZ (51.08%)	56.23%	runoff election
Vodice	HDZ (45.45%)	47.18%	Branka Juričev-Martinčev, HDZ (53.55%)	47.18%	first round win
Vodnjan	IDS, SDP (53.60%)	48.77%	Klaudio Vitasović, IDS (62.58%)	48.77%	first round win
Vrbovec	HDZ, HSS, HSU (44.69%)	50.06%	Vladimir Bregović, HDZ (59.66%)	43.65%	runoff election
Vrbovsko	SDP, PGS (28.18%)	56.65%	Željko Mirković, SDP (49.47%)	51.61%	runoff election
Vrgorac	HDZ, HSS (51.29%)	64.38%	Borislav Matković, HDZ (55.79%)	68.12%	runoff election
Vrlika	HDZ (58.61%)	50.60%	Ivan Ćorić, HDZ (56.49%)	50.60%	first round win
Vukovar	HDZ, HSP, HSU, HSS, HSLS (42.77%)	34.03%	Željko Sabo, SDP (51.03%)	35.07%	runoff election
Zabok	SDP, HSS, HSU (45.62%)	59.09%	Ivan Hanžek, SDP (54.16%)	59.09%	first round win
Zadar	HDZ, HSS, HSLS, HSP, HSU (50.69%)	37.51%	Zvonimir Vrančić, HDZ (55.06%)	37.45%	first round win
Zaprešić	HDZ, HSS, HSU, ZS (38.55%)	41.14%	Željko Turk, HDZ (55.24%)	39.97%	runoff election
Zlatar	HDZ, HSS, ZS (44.48%)	37.43%	Miroslav Kopjar, HDZ (53.84%)	37.41%	first round win
Županja	HDZ, HSU (47.54%)	40.91%	Davor Miličević, HDZ (51.73%)	40.91%	first round win
Source: State Electoral Committee

Party	Mayors
HDZ	59
SDP	29
IDS	9
HNS-LD	7
Independent	6
HSS	5
HSLS	4
HSP	3
PGS	2
HDSSB	1
HSU	1

== Elections in major cities ==
- 2009 Zagreb local elections
- 2009 Split local elections
