= 2013 Croatian local elections =

| ← 2009 | 19 May and 2 June 2013 | 2017 → |
| Party | HDZ | SDP | HSS |
| Prefects | 10 | 3 | 3 |
| Prefects +/- | Steady | ▼2 | Steady |
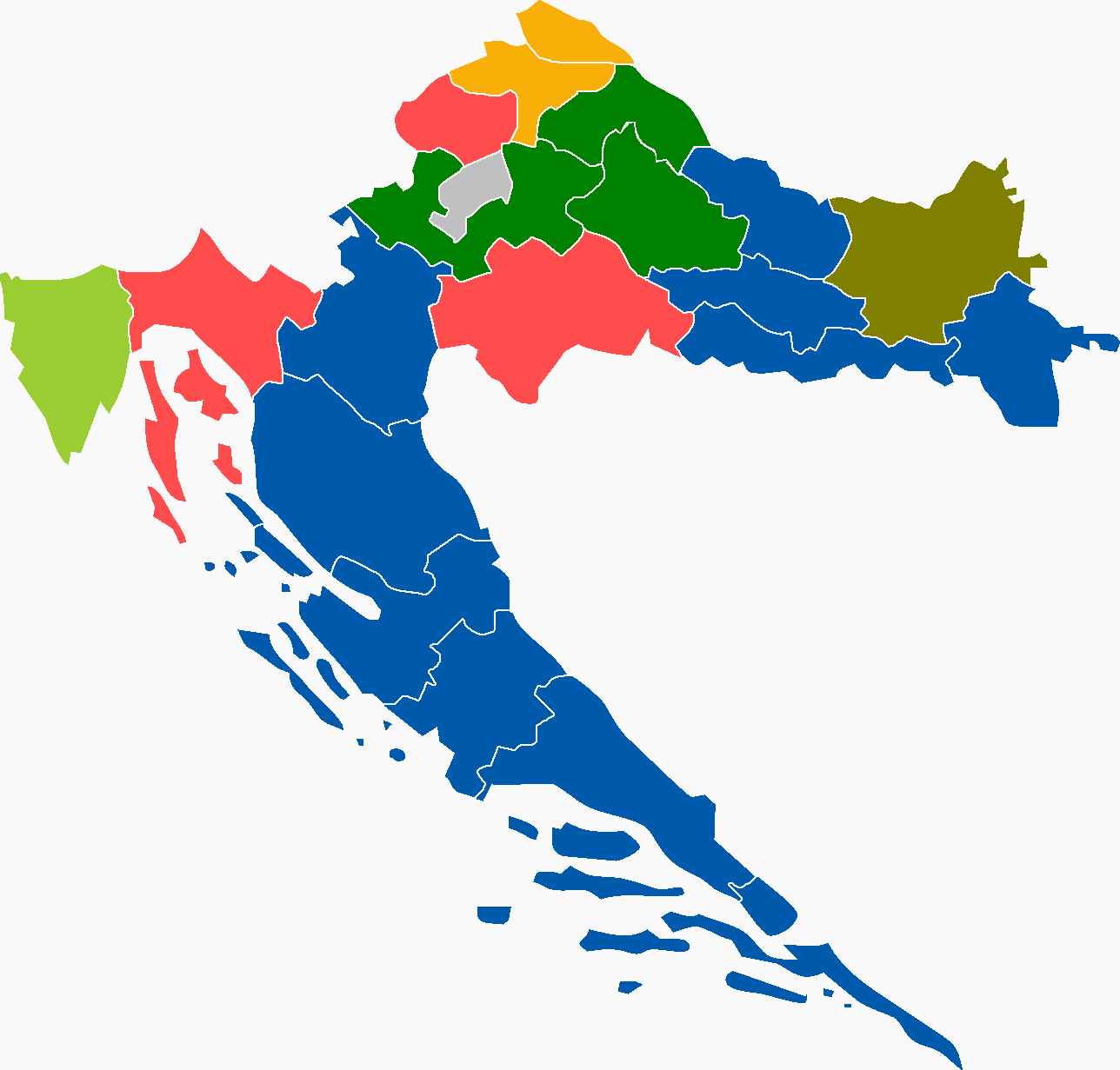
- Elected county prefects in each county of Croatia; HDZ SDP HSS HNS-LD HDSSB IDS Independent

Local elections were held in Croatia on 19 May 2013, with the second round held on 2 June where necessary.

The elections were held to elect members of city councils, mayors, members of county councils and county prefects. The turnout was 47%, and 43% in the second round.

== Summary of mayoral results ==
In Zagreb, populist right-wing and former Social Democrat Milan Bandić won 47.9% of the vote against Social Democrat Health Minister Rajko Ostojić's 22.7%. Bandic received a two-thirds majority in the second round.

The incumbent mayor of Split, Željko Kerum, placed third with 18.54% of the vote and was eliminated from the second round which was narrowly won by the Socialist candidate Ivo Baldasar.

In Slavonia's largest city, Osijek, the HDSSB candidate, mayor Krešimir Bubalo, won 36.3% of the vote in the first round, but lost to Independent candidate Ivan Vrkić, who gained 27.8% in the second round.

== Results ==
=== Counties ===
Results of 2013 elections in Croatian counties
| County | County council | | County prefect | | |
| County | Plurality | Turnout | Prefect | Turnout | Notes |
|---|---|---|---|---|---|
| Bjelovar-Bilogora | HDZ (29.84%) | 47.46% | Damir Bajs, HSS (64.4%) | 39.47% | runoff election |
| Brod-Posavina | HDZ (39.62%) | 46.8% | Danijel Marušić, HDZ (51.59%) | 46.8% | first round win |
| Dubrovnik-Neretva | HDZ (41.57%) | 56.73% | Nikola Dobroslavić, HDZ (55.04%) | 56.73% | first round win |
| Istria | IDS (43.93%) | 45.33% | Ivan Jakovčić, IDS (55.04%) | 37.9% | runoff election |
| Karlovac | HDZ (47.42%) | 46.16% | Ivan Vučić, HDZ (55.42%) | 39.52% | runoff election |
| Koprivnica-Križevci | SDP (45.9%) | 46.37% | Darko Koren, HSS (53.22%) | 46.39% | first round win |
| Krapina-Zagorje | SDP (45.49%) | 51.12% | Željko Kolar, SDP (51.72%) | 50.89% | first round win |
| Lika-Senj | HDZ (58.31%) | 52.89% | Milan Kolić, HDZ (52.34%) | 52.89% | first round win |
| Međimurje | SDP (30.32%) | 45.04% | Matija Posavec, HNS (52.79%) | 34.39% | runoff election |
| Osijek-Baranja | HDSSB (33.39%) | 49.59% | Vladimir Šišljagić, HDSSB (53.4%) | 45.06% | runoff election |
| Požega-Slavonia | HDZ (40.56%) | 52.85% | Alojz Tomašević, HDZ (60.54%) | 46.04% | runoff election |
| Primorje-Gorski Kotar | SDP (42.55%) | 41.4% | Zlatko Komadina, SDP (54.01%) | 44.41% | first round win |
| Sisak-Moslavina | HDZ (34.95%) | 47.51% | Marina Lovrić, SDP (54.8%) | 46.64% | runoff election |
| Split-Dalmatia | HDZ (33.97%) | 49.82% | Zlatko Ževrnja, HDZ (55.84%) | 44.5% | runoff election |
| Šibenik-Knin | HDZ (39.73%) | 46.8% | Goran Pauk, HDZ (55.37%) | 40.09% | runoff election |
| Varaždin | HNS (48.09%) | 48.62% | Predrag Štromar, HNS (62.79%) | 38.73% | first round win |
| Virovitica-Podravina | HDZ (51.01%) | 50.33% | Tomislav Tolušić, HDZ (52.67%) | 50.34% | first round win |
| Vukovar-Syrmia | HDZ (48.86%) | 51.58% | Božo Galić, HDZ (54.76%) | 51.55% | first round win |
| Zadar | HDZ (47.73%) | 46.95% | Stipe Zrilić, HDZ (61.31%) | 37.02% | runoff election |
| Zagreb County | HDZ (28.10%) | 45.14% | Stjepan Kožić, HSS (56.53%) | 45.15% | first round win |
Source: State Electoral Commission

=== Cities ===
==== City of Zagreb ====
| Candidate | Party | First round | | Second round | |
| Candidate | Party | Votes | % | Votes | % |
|---|---|---|---|---|---|
| Milan Bandić | Independent | 142,646 | 47.76 | 170,798 | 66.99 |
| Rajko Ostojić | Social Democratic Party | 68,475 | 22.93 | 84,179 | 33.01 |
| Vladimir Ferdelji | Croatian Social Liberal Party | 55,263 | 18.50 | | |
| Margareta Mađerić | Croatian Democratic Union | 16,316 | 5.46 | | |
| Tatjana Holjevac | Zagreb Independent List | 6,161 | 2.06 | | |
| Branko Vukšić | Croatian Labourists – Labour Party | 5,908 | 1.98 | | |
| Ante-Zvonimir Golem | Independent | 2,334 | 0.78 | | |
| Siniša Šukunda | Croatian Party of Rights | 1,545 | 0.52 | | |
| Total | | 298,648 | 100.00 | 254,977 | 100.00 |
| Valid votes | | 298,648 | 98.14 | 254,977 | 98.08 |
| Invalid/blank votes | | 5,649 | 1.86 | 4,997 | 1.92 |
| Total votes | | 304,297 | 100.00 | 259,974 | 100.00 |
| Registered voters/turnout | | 682,204 | 44.60 | 683,573 | 38.03 |
Source: State Election Committee

==== City of Split ====
| Candidate | Party | First round | | Second round | |
| Candidate | Party | Votes | % | Votes | % |
|---|---|---|---|---|---|
| Ivo Baldasar | SDP–HNS–HSU | 21,280 | 29.93 | 33,365 | 50.47 |
| Vjekoslav Ivanišević | HDZ–HČSP–HSLS–HSP AS–HKDU–BUZ | 15,803 | 22.23 | 32,750 | 49.53 |
| Željko Kerum | HGS–HSS–SU | 13,471 | 18.95 | | |
| Marijana Puljak | Independent | 6,998 | 9.84 | | |
| Anđelka Visković | Independent | 5,777 | 8.13 | | |
| Tomislav Zaninović | Independent | 2,115 | 2.97 | | |
| Damir Vidošević | Independent | 1,340 | 1.88 | | |
| Sanja Bilač | Independent | 1,339 | 1.88 | | |
| Pero Vučica | Croatian Growth | 1,043 | 1.47 | | |
| Hrvoje Tomasović | Croatian Democratic Free Alliance of Dalmatia | 990 | 1.39 | | |
| Marijo Popović | A-HSP–HSP | 942 | 1.32 | | |
| Total | | 71,098 | 100.00 | 66,115 | 100.00 |
| Valid votes | | 71,098 | 97.76 | 66,115 | 97.30 |
| Invalid/blank votes | | 1,626 | 2.24 | 1,837 | 2.70 |
| Total votes | | 72,724 | 100.00 | 67,952 | 100.00 |
| Registered voters/turnout | | 152,290 | 47.75 | 152,572 | 44.54 |
Source: State Election Committee
