= Amulić =

Amulić is a surname. Notable people with the surname include:

- Ivo Amulić (1911–1973), Yugoslav politician
- Ivo Amulić (born 1962), Croatian rock singer
