= Coat of arms of Split =

- Armiger: Ivica Puljak, Mayor of Split
- Adopted: 1969 (basic design dates back to at least the 14th century)
- Earlier version(s)
- Use: To represent the City of Split.

The Coat of arms of Split is the heraldic symbol of the city of Split, in use since at least the Middle Ages. It consists of a rectangular escutcheon (shield), featuring a part of the northern walls of Diocletian's Palace, as they appeared in the Medieval period. In the middle, above the walls, is the belfry of the Cathedral of Saint Domnius. In the upper corners are two shields, to the left (dexter) the historical coat of arms of Croatia, and right (sinister) a shield picturing the town's patron, Saint Domnius. The coat of arms is bordered with Gothic rectangles, which represent the walls of the Palace.

== History ==
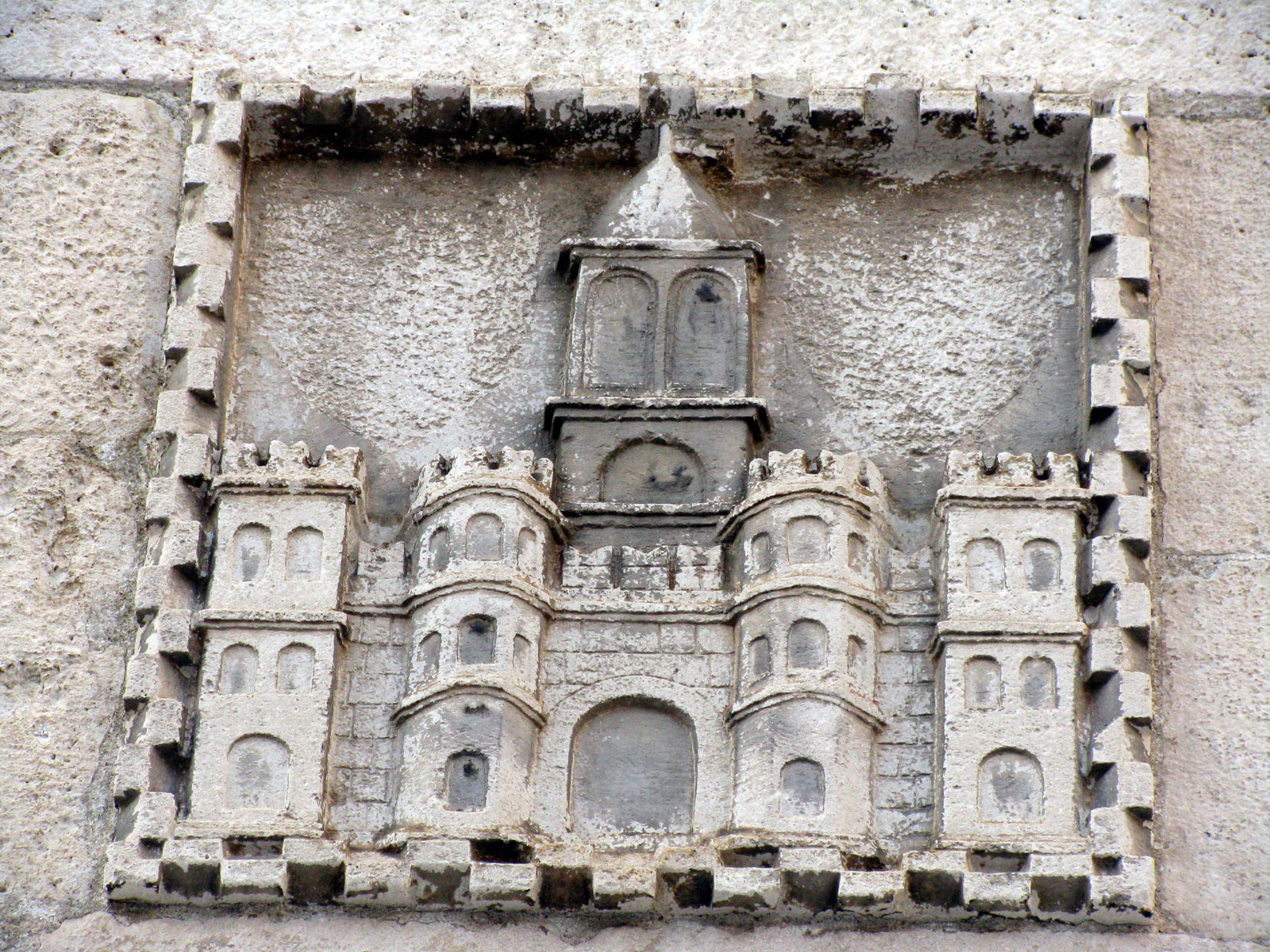
The arms on the wall of the Old City Hall in Split.

The oldest confirmation of Split using the basic design of the rectangular coat of arms, featuring the north walls of the Palace, dates to the early 14th century. Stone cuttings are preserved from the 14th and 15th centuries featuring the same arms with the shields about the belfry. At any one time these shields represented the rulers to whom Split owed its allegiance.

Later on, the coat of arms was also found without the shields by the belfry, and sometimes using different shapes other than rectangular. In the 19th and 20th centuries, the arms sometimes used a classical heraldic shield, as a rule without the shields around the belfry.

After World War II, no coat of arms was used until 1969, when the Medieval arms were restored in their old rectangular shape, and once again with shields on the sides of the belfry: this time a red Croatian chequy representing Croatia, and a red star shield representing Yugoslavia. Besides the new shields, the 1969 version also introduced the current colour scheme, i.e. the use of blue for the Palace outline and the border, on a white background, with red shields around the belfry (red, white, and blue being Croatian colours).

The 1969 design essentially persists to this day, with the Yugoslav red star being replaced in 1991 (after the Breakup of Yugoslavia), with a white image of Saint Domnius on a blue background.

== Modern variants ==
The arms used by the Split Hospital differ primarily in that the shield featuring a white Saint Domnius has a red background. The city municipal transport company, Promet Split, uses a variant with a bus pictured exiting from the gates of the Palace.

== See also ==
- Flag of Split
- Split
- Coat of arms of Dalmatia
- Flag of Dalmatia
