= 2005 Croatian local elections =

← 2001	15 May 2005	2009 →

Local elections were held in Croatia on 15 May 2005. This were the fourth local elections in Croatia since independence.

Voting at 6,589 separate polling stations across Croatia for members of representative bodies of local and regional self-government units, the citizens elected members for a total of 426 municipal and 123 city councils, as well as members for 20 county assemblies, and the Zagreb City Assembly. At the time of these elections, Croatia had a total of 4,015,832 registered voters.

== Electoral system ==
Councilors of regional and local council were elected by a closed list proportional system. The electoral threshold was set at 5%. The number of councilors elected depended on the population of each constituency. Municipalities and towns up to with up to 3,000 inhabitants elected between 7 and 13 councilors, municipalities and towns up to 10,000 inhabitants elected between 9 and 15 councilors, municipalities and cities up to 30,000 inhabitants elected between 13 and 19 councilors, cities with over 30,000 inhabitants elected between 19 and 35 councilors, while the City of Zagreb elected 51 councilors. For county councils between 31 and 51 councilors were elected, with no connection to the number of inhabitants. In some constituencies the total number of seats differed slightly due special additional seats for national minorities which were assigned independently.

== Election results ==
=== Counties ===
Results of 2005 elections in Croatian counties
County	County council	
County	Plurality	Turnout
Bjelovar-Bilogora	HSS, SDP (36.93%)	41.81%
Brod-Posavina	HSS, SDP, HNS, DSSR (30.11%)	40.33%
Dubrovnik-Neretva	SDP, HSS, HNS, LS, HSLS (35.64%)	51.78%
Istria	IDS (41.93%)	42.39%
Karlovac	HDZ, HSLS, DC (37.85%)	42.49%
Koprivnica-Križevci	HSS, SDP (59.31%)	45.44%
Krapina-Zagorje	HDZ (29.89%)	42.94%
Lika-Senj	HDZ, DC (51.05%)	45.13%
Međimurje	HNS (29.98%)	41.90%
Osijek-Baranja	Ind. (26.86%)	43.75%
Požega-Slavonia	HDZ (32.48%)	43.65%
Primorje-Gorski Kotar	SDP, HNS, IDS, HSS, HSU, LS, ARS, SDA (47.34%)	37.33%
Sisak-Moslavina	SDP, HSS, HNS, LS, SDA (34.96%)	41.81%
Split-Dalmatia	HDZ (32.46%)	38.64%
Šibenik-Knin	HDZ (36.64%)	39.85%
Varaždin	HNS, HSLS, SHUS (49.84%)	51.78%
Virovitica-Podravina	HDZ, HSLS (37.37%)	42.33%
Vukovar-Syrmia	HDZ (30.67%)	39.51%
Zadar	HDZ, HSLS (40.85%)	40.79%
Zagreb County	HSS, SDP (36.23%)	40.02%
City of Zagreb	SDP, HSS, HSU (40.95%)	35.94%
Source: State Electoral Committee

=== Cities ===
Results of 2005 elections in Croatian cities
	City Council	
City	Plurality	Turnout
Bakar	HDZ, DC, HD (17.53%)	44.59%
Beli Manastir	HDZ (35.08%)	40.67%
Belišće	SDP, HSU, HSLS, HSS (49.45%)	44.78%
Benkovac	HDZ (49.60%)	26.70%
Biograd na Moru	HDZ (49.98%)	48.00%
Bjelovar	HSLS, HNS, HSU (59.86%)	38.97%
Buje	IDS (39.76%)	40.56%
Buzet	IDS (41.90%)	56.64%
Cres	Ind. (35.12%)	58.93%
Crikvenica	SDP, HNS, HSLS, HSU (39.09%)	28.85%
Čabar	Ind. (31.80%)	58.01%
Čakovec	SDP, HSS, HSU (40.00%)	41.63%
Čazma	HSS (38.08%)	54.31%
Daruvar	HSS (23.55%)	36.73%
Delnice	PGS (56.32%)	46.75%
Donja Stubica	HSS, SDP, HNS, HSU (37.25%)	35.80%
Donji Miholjac	HNS, HSS, SDP (21.66%)	42.84%
Drniš	Ind. (36.73%)	47.42%
Dubrovnik	HDZ (35.17%)	43.39%
Duga Resa	HDZ (21.75%)	46.59%
Dugo Selo	SDP, HSS (37.93%)	28.07%
Đakovo	SDP, HNS, HSS (50.49%)	41.20%
Đurđevac	SDP (33.64%)	47.75%
Garešnica	SDP (38.52%)	39.69%
Glina	HDZ, HSLS (44.26%)	39.37%
Gospić	HDZ (65.63%)	36.96%
Grubišno Polje	HDZ (35.93%)	34.06%
Hrvatska Kostajnica	HDZ (45.34%)	48.28%
Hvar	HDZ (23.49%)	47.25%
Ilok	HSS, HSLS (33.05%)	46.52%
Imotski	HDZ (30.52%)	34.60%
Ivanec	SDP, HSS, HSU, LS (33.16%)	46.44%
Ivanić-Grad	SDP (35.59%)	34.52%
Jastrebarsko	HSS (54.73%)	57.80%
Karlovac	HDZ, HSLS, DC (32.47%)	39.31%
Kastav	SDP, IDS, HSS, LS, HSU (45.05%)	33.16%
Kaštela	HDZ (44.21%)	31.94%
Klanjec	HSLS, ZDS (51.59%)	50.67%
Knin	SDSS (36.57%)	35.08%
Komiža	SDP, HNS (33.93%)	60.17%
Koprivnica	SDP, HSS (71.90%)	45.51%
Korčula	SDP, HSS, HNS (40.86%)	53.75%
Kraljevica	SDP, HNS, HSU (30.16%)	42.86%
Krapina	HDZ (30.41%)	42.10%
Križevci	HSS, HSLS (49.75%)	42.39%
Krk	PGS, HNS, HSLS (53.90%)	38.58%
Kutina	HDZ (24.34%)	37.92%
Labin	IDS (44.09%)	38.67%
Lepoglava	HNS, HSLS, SHUS (37.01%)	41.68%
Lipik	HDZ (28.90%)	30.90%
Ludbreg	SDP (27.73%)	45.76%
Makarska	SDP, HNS, HSS (37.50%)	43.68%
Mali Lošinj	HDZ, HSLS, HKDU (38.54%)	51.38%
Metković	Ind. (51.50%)	57.04%
Mursko Središće	SDP, HSU (29.06%)	32.74%
Našice	HDZ, HSLS (34.76%)	46.29%
Nin	HSS, SDP (28.04%)	42.57%
Nova Gradiška	SDP, HNS, HSS, HSLS (30.56%)	36.97%
Novalja	HDZ (50.90%)	70.08%
Novi Marof	HDZ (42.54%)	54.51%
Novi Vinodolski	SDP, HSU, HSS, HNS (42.45%)	52.79%
Novigrad	IDS (62.11%)	45.26%
Novska	HDZ (34.80%)	36.36%
Obrovac	HDZ (32.06%)	40.97%
Ogulin	HDZ, DC (39.96%)	44.36%
Omiš	HDZ (38.29%)	44.64%
Opatija	Ind. (29.77%)	40.13%
Opuzen	HDZ (44.38%)	62.37%
Orahovica	HDZ (41.07%)	49.57%
Oroslavje	HDZ (32.17%)	44.42%
Osijek	Ind. (25.42%)	40.98%
Otočac	HDZ (46.23%)	45.17%
Ozalj	SDP (46.04%)	44.21%
Pag	SDP, DC, HSLS (23.94%)	67.94%
Pakrac	HDZ (37.50%)	29.75%
Pazin	IDS (28.87%)	41.68%
Petrinja	HNS, SDP, HSS, LS (44.40%)	42.60%
Pleternica	HDZ (60.95%)	53.84%
Ploče	SDP, HSU (37.54%)	49.67%
Poreč	IDS (37.53%)	36.63%
Požega	SDP (58.09%)	45.24%
Pregrada	HDZ (34.26%)	39.32%
Prelog	HNS (40.48%)	45.95%
Pula	IDS (30.06%)	36.11%
Rab	SDP, HSU, IDS (31.26%)	47.75%
Rijeka	SDP, HNS, IDS, HSU, HSS, LS, ARS, SDA (48.74%)	30.02%
Rovinj	IDS (58.79%)	35.36%
Samobor	LS, HNS (26.05%)	37.22%
Senj	HDZ (41.11%)	47.52%
Sinj	SDP, HSLS, HNS, HSS, HSU, LS (46.91%)	46.96%
Sisak	SDP, HNS, HSS, LS (38.12%)	45.68%
Skradin	HDZ (56.68%)	38.03%
Slatina	SDP, HSS, HNS (51.01%)	36.12%
Slavonski Brod	SDP, HNS, HSS, DSSR (24.48%)	32.68%
Slunj	HDZ (43.21%)	38.79%
Solin	HDZ (32.72%)	33.75%
Split	SDP, HNS, HSU, HSS (29.62%)	30.67%
Stari Grad	HSS (30.40%)	52.52%
Supetar	SDP, HNS (27.78%)	50.18%
Sveti Ivan Zelina	HSS, SDP (37.47%)	42.16%
Šibenik	HDZ (40.72%)	35.26%
Trilj	HDZ (40.55%)	41.63%
Trogir	HDZ (44.18%)	46.41%
Umag	IDS (31.45%)	36.93%
Valpovo	HDZ, HSLS (33.30%)	46.88%
Varaždin	HSLS, HNS, HSU (72.97%)	51.85%
Varaždinske Toplice	HSLS, DC (36.36%)	64.75%
Velika Gorica	HDZ (37.40%)	37.84%
Vinkovci	HDZ (35.74%)	38.20%
Virovitica	HDZ (47.59%)	43.28%
Vis	SDP, HSS (30.79%)	62.38%
Vodice	HDZ (39.97%)	44.63%
Vodnjan	IDS (44.01%)	46.02%
Vrbovec	HDZ (22.56%)	42.77%
Vrbovsko	SDP, PGS (28.30%)	49.17%
Vrgorac	HDZ (49.70%)	50.28%
Vrlika	HDZ (73.73%)	39.80%
Vukovar	HDZ (35.81%)	34.04%
Zabok	SDP, HSS, HNS, LS (42.15%)	52.36%
Zadar	HDZ, HSLS, HKDU (33.75%)	34.76%
Zaprešić	Ind. (27.32%)	33.98%
Zlatar	HNS, HSS, SDP (39.59%)	31.32%
Županja	SDP, HSS (27.85%)	31.22%
Source: State Electoral Committee

== Elections in capital ==
- 2005 Zagreb local elections
