= Mayor of Split =

Mayor of the City of Split
- Gradonačelnik Grada Splita
- Coat of arms of Split
- Incumbent; Tomislav Šuta since 9 June 2025
- Term length: 4 years, unlimited number of renewals
- Inaugural holder: Jakov Cindro
- Formation: 1806
- Website: split.hr

The Mayor of the City of Split (Croatian: Gradonačelnik Grada Splita), colloquially the Poteštat (derived from "podestà"), is the highest official of the Croatian city of Split. From 1990 to 2007 the mayor was elected by the city assembly. Since 2007 Croatian mayors have been elected directly by the citizens. The first such election in Split occurred in 2009.

== List ==
Here follows a list of the 72 men who have thus far served as Mayor (or President of the City Council) of the City of Split. They were immediately preceded by the succession of podestà (city "princes" or "governors", kneževi) under the Venetian Republic. The latter were colloquially known as "poteštati", and usually also held the office of Captain of the city. The term "poteštat" has since remained as a local, traditional term for the mayor as well.

=== Kingdom of Italy ===
Independent

Coat of Arms of the noble House of Cindro

No.	Mayor	Lifespan	Term of office		Party	Note
1	Jakov Cindro	1755–1818	1806	1809	Independent	Preceded by last Venetian Podestà (and City Captain) Nicolo Barozzi, who was removed in 1797. Stepped down amid political disputes in 1809.

=== French Empire ===
No.	Mayor	Lifespan	Term of office		Party	Note
N/A	Petar Alberti		1809	1810	Independent	Acting mayor. First term.
N/A	Antun Sarti		1810	1810	Independent	Acting mayor.
N/A	Nikola Ivellio		1810	1810	Independent	Acting mayor.
N/A	Petar Alberti		1810	1811	Independent	Acting mayor. Second term.
2	Josip Cindro		1811	1813	Independent	

=== Austria ===
People's Party Autonomist Party

No.	Mayor		Lifespan	Term of office		Party	Note
3		Karlo Lanza	1778–1834	1813	1814		
4		Petar Nutrizio-Grisogono	1748–1823	1814	1818	Autonomist Party	
5		Petar Cambi		1818	1823	Autonomist Party	
6		Leonard Kružević		1823	1825	Autonomist Party	
7		Ivan Lovro Alberti	1795–1879	1825	1831	Autonomist Party	
8		Leonard Dudan	1798–1864	1832	1840	Autonomist Party	Served as municipal governor from 1834 to 1837.
9		Jerko Capogrosso		1841	1844	Autonomist Party	
10		Mihovil Tartaglia	1798–1886	1845	1848	Autonomist Party	
11		Leonard Dudan	1798–1864	1848	1853	Autonomist Party	
12		Šimun de Michieli-Vitturi	1801–1868	1853	1859	Autonomist Party	Presided over the start of the so-called "Split Renaissance".
13		Antonio Bajamonti	1822–1891	1860	1864	Autonomist Party	First term. Held longest term in office as mayor of Split: headed city government almost continuously for 20 years (1860–1880).
14		Frano Lanza	1808–1892	1864	1865	Autonomist Party	
15		Antonio Bajamonti	1822–1891	1865	1880	Autonomist Party	Second term. This time representing the Liberal Union coalition. The longest term in office of any Mayor of Split.
16		Aleksandar Nallini		1880	1882	Autonomist Party	Imperial commissioner.
17		Emil Ragazzini		1882	1882	Autonomist Party	Imperial commissioner.
18		Dujam Rendić-Miočević	1834–1915	1882	1885	People's Party	Resigned due to conflict with Gajo Filomen Bulat.
19	Gajo Bulat	Gajo Filomen Bulat	1836–1900	1885	1893	People's Party	
20		Ivan Mangjer	1840–1919	1893	1897		
21		Petar Katalinić	1844–1922	1897	1899		First mayor from the Katalinić family.
22		Vinko Milić	1833–1910	1900	1906		
23	Ante Trumbić	Ante Trumbić	1864–1938	1906	1907	Croatian Party	
24		Vicko Mihaljević	1861–1911	1907	1911		Served as the inspiration for the mayor character in the Velo Misto series by Miljenko Smoje.
25		Vinko Katalinić	1857–1917	1911	1912		First term. Second mayor from the Katalinić family.
26		Teodor Šporn	1879–1953	1912	1913		Imperial commissioner. First term.
27		Vinko Katalinić	1857–1917	1913	1914		Second term.
28		Frane Madirazza	1885–1929	1914	1917		Imperial commissioner.
29		Vicko Niseteo		1917	1917		Acting imperial commissioner.
30		Teodor Šporn	1879–1953	1917	1918		Imperial commissioner. Second term.
31	Josip Smodlaka	Josip Smodlaka	1869–1956	1918	1918	Croatian Democratic Party	First term. Previously a member of the Imperial Council of the Austrian Empire. Later became a member of the NKOJ and the first foreign minister of the second Yugoslavia.

=== Kingdom of Yugoslavia ===
Yugoslav National Party Yugoslav Radical Union Croatian Peasant Party

No.	Mayor		Lifespan	Term of office		Party	Note
32	Ivo Tartaglia	Ivo Tartaglia	1880–1949	1918	1928		Held office for 10 years. His extensive art collection formed the core of the exhibitions in the future Gallery of Fine Arts in Split.
33		Petar Bonetti	1888–1967	1928	1928		Royal commissioner
34		Josip Berković	1885–1968	1928	1929		
35		Jakša Račić	1868–1943	1929	1933	Yugoslav National Party	Medical doctor, head of the city sanatorium. Modernized medical services in the city; began the forestation of Marjan hill. An ethnic Croat, he was a member of the Chetnik movement during World War II. He was executed by Dalmatian Partisans.
36		Mihovil Kargotić		1933	1938		
37		Mirko Buić	1894–1967	1938	1938		
38		Vlado Matošić		1938	1939	Yugoslav Radical Union	
39		Ivan Zlatko Vrdoljak		1939	1939		
40		Stjepan Spalatin		1939	1940		
41		Josip Brkić	1887–1959	1940	1941	Croatian Peasant Party	

=== World War II ===
National Liberation Front (resistance coalition) Communist Party of Yugoslavia

No.	Mayor	Lifespan	Term of office		Party	Note
Civil Commissioners; Italian occupation 1941–43
N/A	Bruno Nardelli		April; 1941	28 April 1941	National Fascist Party	
N/A	Antonio Tacconi	1880–1962	28 April 1941	1943	National Fascist Party	Civil Commissioner (mayor) for Split after the city's formal annexation into fascist Italy.

No.	Mayor		Lifespan	Term of office		Party	Note
Presidents of the National Liberation Committee; Wartime resistance city government 1942–47
42		Ivo Amulić	1911–1973	6 April 1942	15 May 1942	Unitary National Liberation Front (coalition)	
43		Ivo Tijardović	1895–1976	15 May 1942	July; 1943	Unitary National Liberation Front (coalition)	
44	Josip Smodlaka	Josip Smodlaka	1869–1956	September; 1943	October; 1943	Unitary National Liberation Front (coalition)	Second term. Previously a member of the Imperial Council of the Austrian Empire. Later became a member of the NKOJ and the first foreign minister of the second Yugoslavia.
45		Petar Vitezica	1903–1970	October; 1943	May; 1944	Unitary National Liberation Front (coalition)	
46		Umberto Fabris		May; 1944	25 November 1944	Unitary National Liberation Front (coalition)	
47		Ante Mrduljaš		25 November 1944	25 June 1947	Communist Party of Yugoslavia	

=== Federal Yugoslavia ===
League of Communists of Yugoslavia Croatian Democratic Union

The current Coat of arms of Split is a modification of this one introduced during the Yugoslav period, which, in turn, was based on the Medieval (14th century) arms

No.	Mayor	Lifespan	Term of office		Party	Note
48	Marko Šore		1947	1947	Communist Party of Yugoslavia	
49	Ivo Raić		1947	1949	Communist Party of Yugoslavia	
50	Paško Ninčević		1949	1952	Communist Party of Yugoslavia (renamed in 1952)	
51	Ivo Senjanović		1952	1955	League of Communists of Yugoslavia (renamed)	
52	Rade Dumanić	1918–2008	1955	1963	League of Communists of Yugoslavia	Presided over the start of large-scale urbanization and expansion of the city.
53	Ante Zelić		1963	1965	League of Communists of Yugoslavia	Paved the road network on Marjan hill.
54	Ivo Perišin	1925–2008	1965	1967	League of Communists of Yugoslavia	Also at one time held the positions of President of the Executive Council (Prime Minister), and President of the Assembly (Head of State) of Croatia.
55	Jakša Miličić	1926–2024	1967	1974	League of Communists of Yugoslavia	Presided over major urban expansion projects and the construction of the Split 3 district.
56	Vjekoslav Viđak		1974	1982	League of Communists of Yugoslavia	Presided, along with Ante Skataretiko, over the organization and preparations for the 1979 Mediterranean Games in Split.
57	Dragutin Matošić		1982	1983	League of Communists of Yugoslavia	
58	Ante Kovač		1983	1984	League of Communists of Yugoslavia	
59	Božidar Papić		1985	1986	League of Communists of Yugoslavia	
60	Drago Urličić		1986	1987	League of Communists of Yugoslavia	
61	Gordana Kosanović		1987	1990	League of Communists of Yugoslavia	
62	Onesin Cvitan	1939–	1990	1991	Croatian Democratic Union	
62	Onesin Cvitan	1939–	1990		Croatian Democratic Union	

=== Since independence ===
Croatian Democratic Union (5) Social Democratic Party (2) Croatian Social Liberal Party (1) Liberal Party (1) Independent Croatian Civic Party (1) Centre (1)

No.	Mayor		Lifespan	Term of office — Electoral mandate		Party	Note
63	Petar Slapničar	Petar Slapničar	1932–	1991	1993	Croatian Democratic Union	
63	Petar Slapničar	Petar Slapničar	1932–	—		Croatian Democratic Union	
	Nikola Grabić	Nikola Grabić	1938–	1993	1997	Croatian Social Liberal Party	Switched political party mid-term.
64	Nikola Grabić	Nikola Grabić	1938–	—		Croatian Democratic Union	Switched political party mid-term.
65	Ivan Škarić	Ivan Škarić	1944–	1997	2001	Croatian Social Liberal Party	Elected to the Croatian Parliament in 2003.
65	Ivan Škarić	Ivan Škarić	1944–	—		Croatian Social Liberal Party	Elected to the Croatian Parliament in 2003.
66	Slobodan Beroš	Slobodan Beroš	1945–2020	2002	2003	Social Democratic Party	
66	Slobodan Beroš	Slobodan Beroš	1945–2020	—		Social Democratic Party	
67	Miroslav Buličić	Miroslav Buličić	1952–	2003	2005	Liberal Party	
67	Miroslav Buličić	Miroslav Buličić	1952–	—		Liberal Party	
68	Zvonimir Puljić	Zvonimir Puljić	1947–2009	2005	2007	Croatian Democratic Union	Resigned after confrontations with the Velo Misto List coalition partner.
68	Zvonimir Puljić	Zvonimir Puljić	1947–2009	2005		Croatian Democratic Union	Resigned after confrontations with the Velo Misto List coalition partner.
69	Ivan Kuret	Ivan Kuret	1971–	17 July 2007	1 June 2009	Croatian Democratic Union	Continuation of the previous term; appointed following the resignation of his predecessor.
69	Ivan Kuret	Ivan Kuret	1971–	—		Croatian Democratic Union	Continuation of the previous term; appointed following the resignation of his predecessor.
	Željko Kerum	Željko Kerum	1960–	1 June 2009	7 June 2013	Independent	Ran as an independent candidate. After the election, he founded the Croatian Civic Party (HGS). Elected Member of Parliament in 2011 (ran in coalition with the Croatian Democratic Union).
70	Željko Kerum	Željko Kerum	1960–	2009		Croatian Civic Party	Ran as an independent candidate. After the election, he founded the Croatian Civic Party (HGS). Elected Member of Parliament in 2011 (ran in coalition with the Croatian Democratic Union).
71	Ivo Baldasar	Ivo Baldasar	1958–	7 June 2013	28 March 2017	Social Democratic Party	Ran as a candidate for the Social Democratic Party but was thrown out of the party in 2016. Founded The Split Party in 2017. Resigned as mayor after his budget proposals were voted against.
71	Ivo Baldasar	Ivo Baldasar	1958–	2013		Social Democratic Party	Ran as a candidate for the Social Democratic Party but was thrown out of the party in 2016. Founded The Split Party in 2017. Resigned as mayor after his budget proposals were voted against.
—		Branka Ramljak (Government Commissioner)	1962–	28 March 2017	14 June 2017	Independent	
—		Branka Ramljak (Government Commissioner)	1962–	—		Independent	
72		Andro Krstulović Opara	1967–	14 June 2017	7 June 2021	Croatian Democratic Union	
72		Andro Krstulović Opara	1967–	2017		Croatian Democratic Union	
73	Ivica Puljak	Ivica Puljak	1969–	7 June 2021	8 April 2022	Centre	Resigned as mayor along with his deputies following allegations against the deputy for threats made to certain journalists.
73	Ivica Puljak	Ivica Puljak	1969–	2021		Centre	Resigned as mayor along with his deputies following allegations against the deputy for threats made to certain journalists.
—		Mirna Veža (Government Commissioner)		8 April 2022	15 July 2022	Independent	Acting mayor until new is elected.
—		Mirna Veža (Government Commissioner)		—		Independent	Acting mayor until new is elected.
73	Ivica Puljak	Ivica Puljak	1969–	15 July 2022	9 June 2025	Centre	First mayor ever to win reelection in Split.
73	Ivica Puljak	Ivica Puljak	1969–	2022		Centre	First mayor ever to win reelection in Split.
74		Tomislav Šuta	1982–	9 June 2025		Croatian Democratic Union	
74		Tomislav Šuta	1982–	2025		Croatian Democratic Union	

== See also ==
- Split
- Dalmatia
- Split-Dalmatia County
- Elections in Croatia
