= Ranko Ostojić =

Croatian lawyer and politician

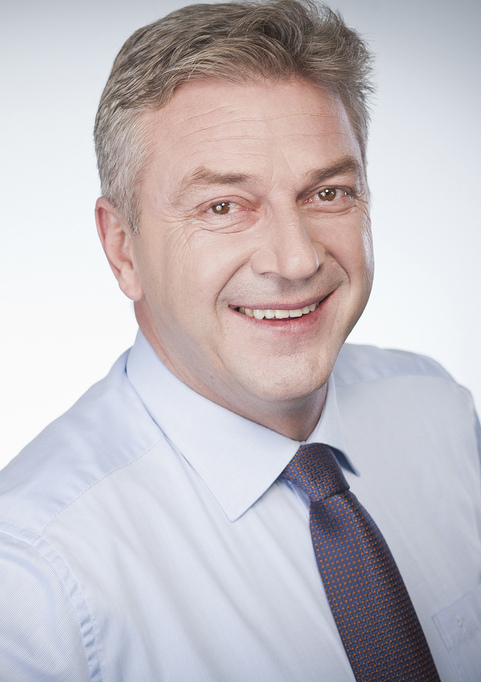

Deputy Prime Minister of Croatia
- In office 15 July 2013 – 22 January 2016
- Prime Minister: Zoran Milanović
- Preceded by: Neven Mimica
- Succeeded by: Božo Petrov

Minister of the Interior
- In office 23 December 2011 – 22 January 2016
- Prime Minister: Zoran Milanović
- Preceded by: Tomislav Karamarko
- Succeeded by: Vlaho Orepić

Personal details
- Born: 3 October 1962 (age 64) Split, PR Croatia, FPR Yugoslavia (modern Croatia)
- Party: Social Democratic Party (1990–2000, 2004–present)
- Education: University of Split
- Occupation: Lawyer; politician

Ranko Ostojić (Croatian pronunciation: [râːnko ôstojitɕ]; born 3 October 1962) is a Croatian lawyer and centre-left politician who served as the 11th Interior Minister in the Cabinet of Zoran Milanović from December 2011 to January 2016.

Ostojić graduated from the Split Faculty of Law in 1988. He held various positions in Split-based companies, and became involved in politics in 1990 when he joined SDP. Between 2001 and 2004 he served as assistant to Interior Minister Šime Lučin during Prime Minister Ivica Račan's government and held the post of Director of Police.

Before becoming government minister he served one term as MP in the 6th Sabor from 2007 to 2011 where he chaired the parliamentary committee for internal affairs and national security. During this time he also ran for mayor of Split in the 2009 local elections but finished runner-up with 34.7 percent of the vote, behind independent Željko Kerum.

In 2008, he was a member of the SDP delegation which visited Bleiburg.

The final months of Ostojić's term as Minister of the Interior was marked by the 2015 European migrant crisis, causing an inflow of over 39,000 migrants into Croatia from Serbia by 22 September 2015, after the construction of the border fence on the Serbia-Hungary border. Many migrants fled the Syrian Civil War, as well as poor economic conditions in Africa and South Asia, with Croatia serving mainly as a transit country towards Germany, Scandinavia and Western Europe. The villages of Tovarnik, Ilača and Opatovac, as well as the city of Beli Manastir served as the main acceptance centers for migrants in eastern Croatia, while 1,200 were also housed at Zagreb Fair. By 22 September 2015 over 32,000 migrants had left Croatia through the neighbouring countries of the Schengen area. A larger and permanent migrant center was set up in the city of Slavonski Brod.
