= Little Floramye =

1926 operetta in three acts by Ivo Tijardović

- Opera by Ivo Tijardović
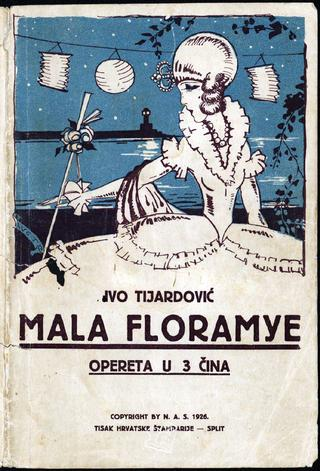
- Native title: Mala Floramye
- Librettist: Ivo Tijardović
- Language: Croatian
- Premiere: 12 January 1926; Split, Croatia

Little Floramye (Croatian: Mala Floramye) is an operetta in three acts by Croatian composer Ivo Tijardović. It premiered on 14 January 1926 in Split.

== Synopsis ==
The first act takes place at the Split waterfront right before the start of the First World War, the second in Quimperville, a small town near Marseille, just before the end of the War, and the third in Split after the war in the apartment of the Little Floramye's girlfriend.

=== First act ===
August. Carnival night. The Split waterfront is decorated with lanterns and flowers. In a crowd of students, Mirko is looking for his Floramye. Three older cavaliers get teased by the group of young man. In particular, they tease Mr. Bepo Pegula for his unsuccessful seductive tendencies. Floramye arrives at the waterfront. She, "the most beautiful flower of Split", sneaked out from home regardless of mother's ban to do so, and expresses love towards Mirko. There is also a strict "guardian of morality and order" present who tries to impress the people by saying: "In the name of the steps, three laws back!", but also gets teased by a group of young men. Mrs. Petronila, angry at Floramye for disobeying her, came to the waterfront to look for Floramye and eventually sees her dancing with Mr. Dan and Mr. File. Floramye runs away when she sees her angry mother, while Dan and File try to calm her down. The most exciting part of the carnival – the election of the Carnival Queen, is getting closer. Floramye wins and chooses Mirko as her king. At the same time, boys tell Mr. Bepo that Floramye scheduled for a date with him. Mr. Bepo shows up at the alleged meeting location with a large bouquet, but instead of Floramye, who is at the time with Mirko, meets Mrs. Petrolina who arrived after hearing that someone was having a date with her daughter. Mr. Bepo gets hit in the head by Mrs. Petronila who also demanded form the guard to arrest him because of the attempted seduction of the juvenile.

=== Second act ===
January. Quimperville, a small place near Marseille. End of the First World War. Floramye left Split and now works as a nurse in a military hospital but before that, she worked in Paris as a cabaret dancer. During the war, she lost contact with her parents and has changed her name to Suzette. War hero, Lieutenant Petar Petrović, is set to arrive at the military hospital where she works. Everyone is preparing for the celebration. Mr. Bepo Pegula is also at Marseille where he met the English paramedic Miss Evelin Beauty-Flower. She invites him to the celebration at the military hospital. He accepts, puts on generals uniform and thus provokes confusion when he arrives at the hospital because everyone thinks that he is Petar Petrović. When real Petar Petrović finally arrives, Suzette recognizes him as Mirko but hides because she is afraid that he would be angry at her for working as a cabaret dancer. They eventually meet, and he forgives her.

=== Third act ===
February. Split. Mr. Bepo Pegula brags about his love adventures with an "English princess of incredible beauty" and various military accomplishments, but when Mirko, Floramye, and Evelin arrive to Split his lies are exposed. The act ends with laughter, poetry, and lovingly happy ending.

== Roles ==
- Mr. Bepo
- Mr. File
- Mr. Dane
- Little Floramye
- Miss Evelin Beauty-Flower
- Mrs. Petronila
- Tonkica
- Marica
- Mirko
- Zvone
- Marinko
- Almette
- Guard
- Mr. Felicio
- American journalist
- Picaferaj

=== Cast ===
- Boris Dvornik, Tonči Banov – Mr. Bepo
- Albin Kokeza, Vinko Maroević – Mr. File
- Vinko Varvodić, Trpimir Jurkić – Mr. Dane
- Marina Jajić, Antonela Malis – Little Floramye
- Maria Boga Verdes – Miss Evelin Beauty-Flower
- Ilija Zovko – Marquis Armand de Guimperville
