= Petar Alberti =

Croatian politician

Mayor of Split
- In office 1809–1810
- Preceded by: Jakov Cindro
- Succeeded by: Antun Sarti
- In office 1810–1811
- Preceded by: Nikola Ivellio
- Succeeded by: Josip Cindro

Personal details
- Born: 24 August 1771 Split, Dalmatia, Republic of Venice
- Died: 15 May 1822 (aged 50) Split, Dalmatia, Austrian Empire

Petar Alberti (24 August 1771 – 15 May 1822) was a Dalmatian politician who served as the Mayor of Split from 1809 to 1810 whilst Split was part of the Illyrian Provinces.

== Sources ==
- "ALBERTI, Petar". Croatian Biographical Lexicon (in Croatian). Miroslav Krleža Institute of Lexicography.
