= Karlo Lanza =

Dalmatian politician

Mayor of Split
- In office 1813–1814
- Preceded by: Josip Cindro
- Succeeded by: Petar Nutrizio-Grisogono

Personal details
- Born: 3 November 1778 Roccasecca
- Died: 29 January 1834 (aged 55) Split, Dalmatia, Austrian Empire
- Spouse: Girolama Signorelli
- Profession: Physician

Karlo Lanza, or in Italian Carlo Lanza di Casalanza, (1778-1834) was a Dalmatian politician from Italy who served as the Mayor of Split. Born in Roccasecca from the old noble family of Lanza di Casalanza, he was a medical doctor.

Lanza was the first director of the Archaeological Museum in Split.
