= Jakša Račić =

Mayor of Split (1868–1943)

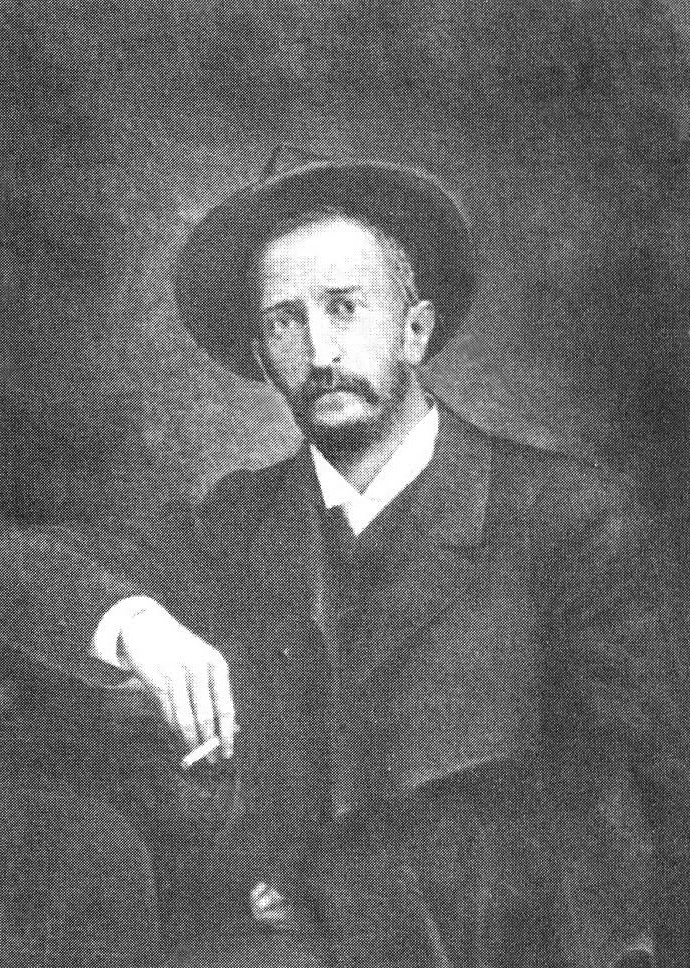
- Portrait of Račić by Amalija Bogdanović-Knežević, painted most likely sometime during the First World War.

Mayor of Split
- In office 1929–1933
- Preceded by: Josip Berković
- Succeeded by: Mihovil Kargotić

Personal details
- Born: 5 August 1868 Vrbanj (Stari Grad), Dalmatia, Austro-Hungary
- Died: 23 August 1943 (aged 75) Split, Dalmatia, Kingdom of Italy
- Party: Yugoslav National Party
- Spouse: Romilda Carstulovich
- Occupation: Politician, medical doctor
- Profession: Medical doctor

Jakša Račić (5 August 1868 – 23 August 1943) was the Mayor of Split between February 1929 and June 1933. An ethnic Croat in modern terms, he was a supporter of King Alexander I's unitarianist policies, and considered himself a Yugoslav and a Dalmatian. He was a medical doctor by profession and one of the few non-Serbian members of the Chetnik movement.

Račić was born on 5 August 1868 in Vrbanj (part of Stari Grad) on the island of Hvar in the Kingdom of Dalmatia and studied in Prague, Graz and Innsbruck, where he attained a doctorate in 1900. He was employed in Innsbruck as an assistant at the Institute for General and Experimental Pathology, undertook further training in Ljubljana and became Director of his own surgical sanatorium in Split in 1904, the Račić Sanatorium. He oversaw the start of hospital modernization in the city, and began the forestation of Marjan hill.

== World War II and assassination ==
At the beginning of World War II Račić was appointed by Draža Mihailović as Chetnik Povjerenik ("trustee") for Dalmatia. Račić worked closely with Chetnik military commander Ilija Trifunović-Birčanin. Račić was executed for treason by the Partisans when, after the Italian capitulation in 1943, they temporarily liberated Split from Italian occupation.

Political offices
| Preceded by Josip Berković | Mayor of Split; 1929 – 1933 | Succeeded by Mihovil Kargotić |
