= Flag of Split =

Vexillological symbol

Split
- Use: Civil flag
- Proportion: 2:3
- Design: Stylized repeated name of the city symbolizing the bell tower of the Cathedral of St. Dominus raised above the historic city center.

Variant of the flag, featuring the device from the pre-1945 coat of arms.

Variant of the flag

The variant of the commemorative flag, celebrating the 1700-year anniversary of the construction of Diocletian's Palace.

The Flag of Split is the vexillological symbol of the city of Split in Croatia. The flag is navy blue with stylized repeated name of the city symbolizing the bell tower of the Cathedral of St. Dominus raising above the historic city center.

Formerly, the flag was blue, with the emblem of the city in silver. The emblem consisted of the walls of Diocletian's Palace, and the bell tower of Saint Domnius Cathedral behind them. Variations of this device have been in use for centuries. In particular, the design of the bell tower has changed. The traditional colours of Split are white (for the city) and blue (for the sea). A variant of the modern commemorative flag, celebrating the 1700-year anniversary of the construction of Diocletian's Palace, is also in common use. This flag is also blue, with a shade gradient from darker to lighter from bottom to top, with the white emblem of the city in the lower half, consisting of six words "SPLIT" forming the silhouette of the walls of Diocletian's Palace and the bell tower of the Saint Domnius Cathedral, topped with a cross.

== See also ==
- Coat of arms of Split
- Split
- Flag of Dalmatia
