= Ivo Tijardović =

Croatian composer, writer and painter

Mayor of Split
- In office 15 May 1942 – 12 September 1943
- Preceded by: Ivo Amulić
- Succeeded by: Josip Smodlaka

Personal details
- Born: 18 September 1895 Split, Dalmatia, Austria-Hungary
- Died: 19 March 1976 (aged 80) Zagreb, SR Croatia, Yugoslavia
- Party: Unitary National Liberation Front
- Education: University of Zagreb
- Occupation: Composer

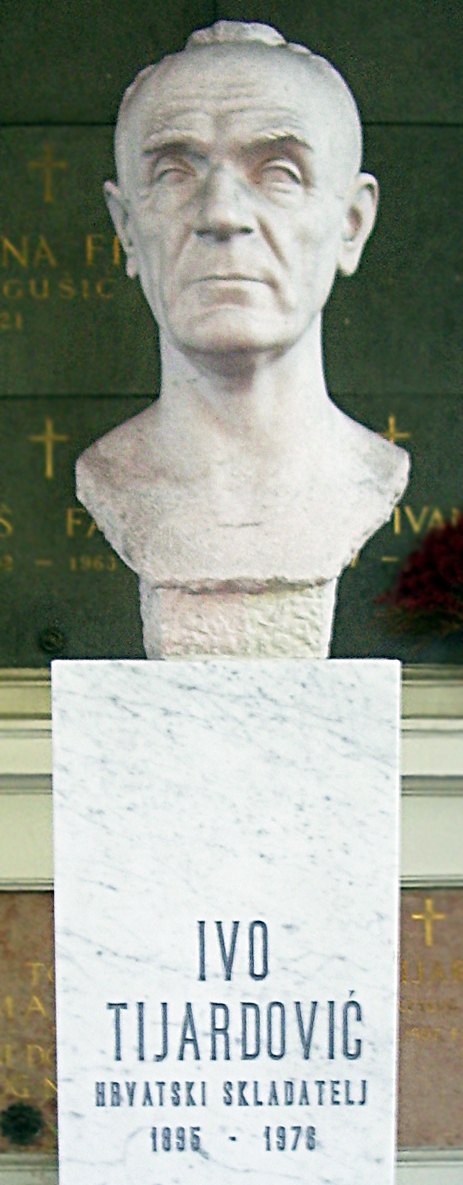
Bust of Ivo Tijardović

Ivo Tijardović (Croatian pronunciation: [ǐːʋo tǐjaːrdoʋit͡ɕ]; 18 September 1895 – 19 March 1976) was a Croatian composer, writer and painter. A member of the Unitary National Liberation Front, he served as the 47th Mayor of Split, during the city's World War II occupation by Fascist Italy, as head of its underground resistance government set up by the Yugoslav Partisans of Josip Broz Tito.

Tijardović was born in the city of Split (then part of the Kingdom of Dalmatia in Austria-Hungary) and studied music in Split and in Vienna, where he also studied architecture. He graduated from the Zagreb drama school in 1922. He then worked as conductor and stage designer at the Split Municipal Theatre (1922–29) before joining the music department of the Edison Bell Penkala recording company in Zagreb (1929–33). Returning to Split, he became director of the Croatian National Theatre, stage director of the Croatian National Theatre in Zagreb, and director of the State Symphony Orchestra (later, the Zagreb Philharmonic). As a composer, he relied on folklore and a national musical expression, especially of his native region of Dalmatia. He composed eight operettas, the best known of which are Mala Floramye ("Little Floramye") and Splitski Akvarel ("The Split Aquarelle"), which conjure the magic of Split between the two world wars. His operas dealt with historical themes. He also painted and worked as an illustrator.

During World War II, when Split was annexed and occupied by Fascist Italy, Ivo Tijardović joined the Unitary National Liberation Front (Jedinstveni narodnooslobodilački front, JNOF), the umbrella organization and political coalition behind the Yugoslav Partisans resistance movement. He soon became active in the city's interim resistance government set-up by the Partisans, the National Liberation Committee (Narodnooslobodilački odbor, NOO), and on 15 May 1942 he became its president (mayor), a post which he held until September 1943. The same year he left the city and joined the Partisans in the countryside. During the remainder of the war, he served as a member of the Croatian parliament, the ZAVNOH, and as President of the Regional National Liberation Committee for Dalmatia. During this period, he reworked the old Split patriotic song "Marjane, Marjane", which soon became the city's anthem in the form he published. He returned to the city after its final liberation in 1944, and revitalized its theatrical scene.

He died in Zagreb, SR Croatia, SFR Yugoslavia.

== Works ==
- Operettas
  - Pierrot Ilo, 1922 Split
  - Mala Floramye (Little Floramye), 1926 Split
  - Splitski Akvarel, 1928 Split
  - Zapovijed maršala Marmonta (Marshal Marmont's Order), 1929 Split
  - Jurek i Štefek, 1931 Zagreb
- Musicals
  - Katarina Velika (Katherine the Great, 1929 Zagreb
- Operas
  - Dimnjaci uz Jadran (Smokestacks on the Adriatic), 1951 Zagreb
  - Marko Polo, 1960 Zagreb
  - Dioklecijan (Diocletian), 1963 Zagreb

== Sources ==
- Koraljka Kos. The New Grove Dictionary of Opera, edited by Stanley Sadie (1992). ISBN 0-333-73432-7 and ISBN 1-56159-228-5

Political offices
Preceded by Ivo Amulić	Mayor of Split; 1942–1943	Succeeded by Josip Smodlaka
