= Josip Cindro =

Croatian politician

Mayor of Split
- In office 1811–1813
- Preceded by: Petar Alberti
- Succeeded by: Karlo Lanza

Josip Cindro (1760–1824) was a Dalmatian politician who was the Mayor of Split.

== Sources ==
- "Cindro". Croatian Encyclopedia (in Croatian).
