= Jakov Cindro =

Croatian politician

Mayor of Split
- In office 1806–1809
- Preceded by: Office established Nicolo Barozzi (as podestà and captain)
- Succeeded by: Petar Alberti

Jakov Cindro (1755–1818; pronounced [jâkoʋ t͡sǐːndro]) was a Dalmatian noble that served as the first Mayor of Split between 1806 and 1809.

== Sources ==
- "Cindro". Croatian Encyclopedia (in Croatian).
