= 2013 Split local elections =

2013 election of local politicians in Split, Croatia

2013 Split mayoral election
- 19 May and 2 June 2013
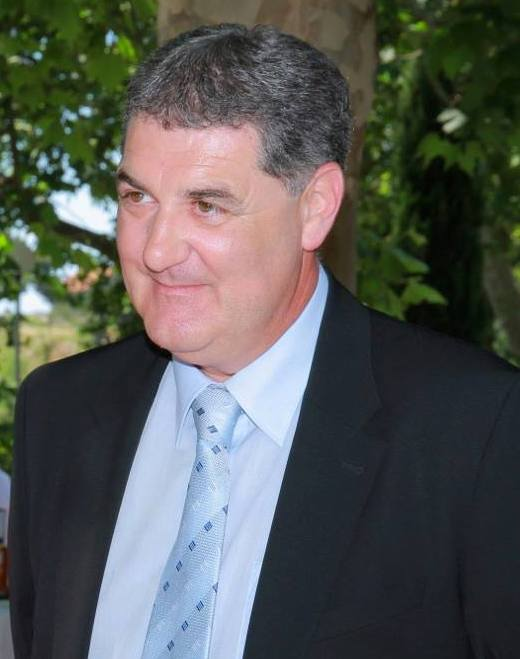
Candidate	Ivo Baldasar	Vjekoslav Ivanišević
Party	SDP	HDZ
Popular vote	33,365	32,750
Percentage	50.47%	49.53%
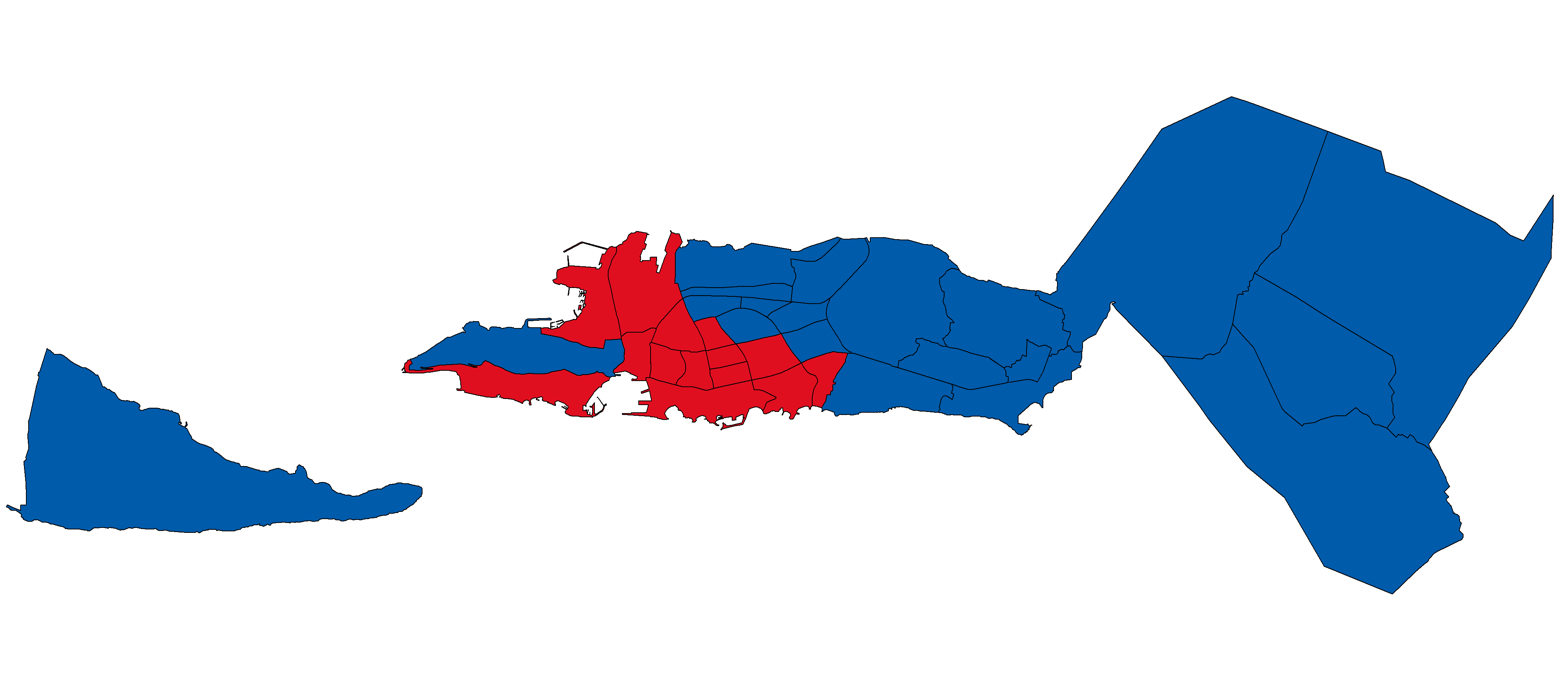
- Results of the second round in all Districts of Split: the candidate with the majority of votes in each district: Ivo Baldasar Vjekoslav Ivanišević
Mayor before election
Željko Kerum
HGS
Elected mayor
Ivo Baldasar
SDP

The 2013 local elections were held in Split, Croatia on 19 May and 2 June 2013.

The incumbent HGS mayor Željko Kerum was running for a full four-year term after winning the previous elections on 31 May 2009. Kerum had a very controversial term as mayor between 2009 and 2013, which resulted in losing in the first round of elections with 18.51% of the votes. The second round of elections was very tense. The SDP candidate for mayor, Ivo Baldasar, defeated HDZ candidate, Vjekoslav Ivanišević, by 615 votes. After the elections Ivanišević asked for a recount. The recount was done and Baldasar was proclaimed the winner.

The SDP-HNS-HSU coalition won also in the council elections and formed a minor government.

== Results ==
=== Mayor ===
Candidate	Party	First round		Second round	
Candidate	Party	Votes	%	Votes	%
Ivo Baldasar	SDP–HNS–HSU	21,280	29.93	33,365	50.47
Vjekoslav Ivanišević	HDZ–HČSP–HSLS–HSP AS–HKDU–BUZ	15,803	22.23	32,750	49.53
Željko Kerum	HGS–HSS–SU	13,471	18.95		
Marijana Puljak	Independent	6,998	9.84		
Anđelka Visković	Independent	5,777	8.13		
Tomislav Zaninović	Independent	2,115	2.97		
Damir Vidošević	Independent	1,340	1.88		
Sanja Bilač	Independent	1,339	1.88		
Pero Vučica	Croatian Growth	1,043	1.47		
Hrvoje Tomasović	Croatian Democratic Free Alliance of Dalmatia	990	1.39		
Marijo Popović	A-HSP–HSP	942	1.32		
Total		71,098	100.00	66,115	100.00
Valid votes		71,098	97.76	66,115	97.30
Invalid/blank votes		1,626	2.24	1,837	2.70
Total votes		72,724	100.00	67,952	100.00
Registered voters/turnout		152,290	47.75	152,572	44.54
Source: State Election Committee

=== City Council ===
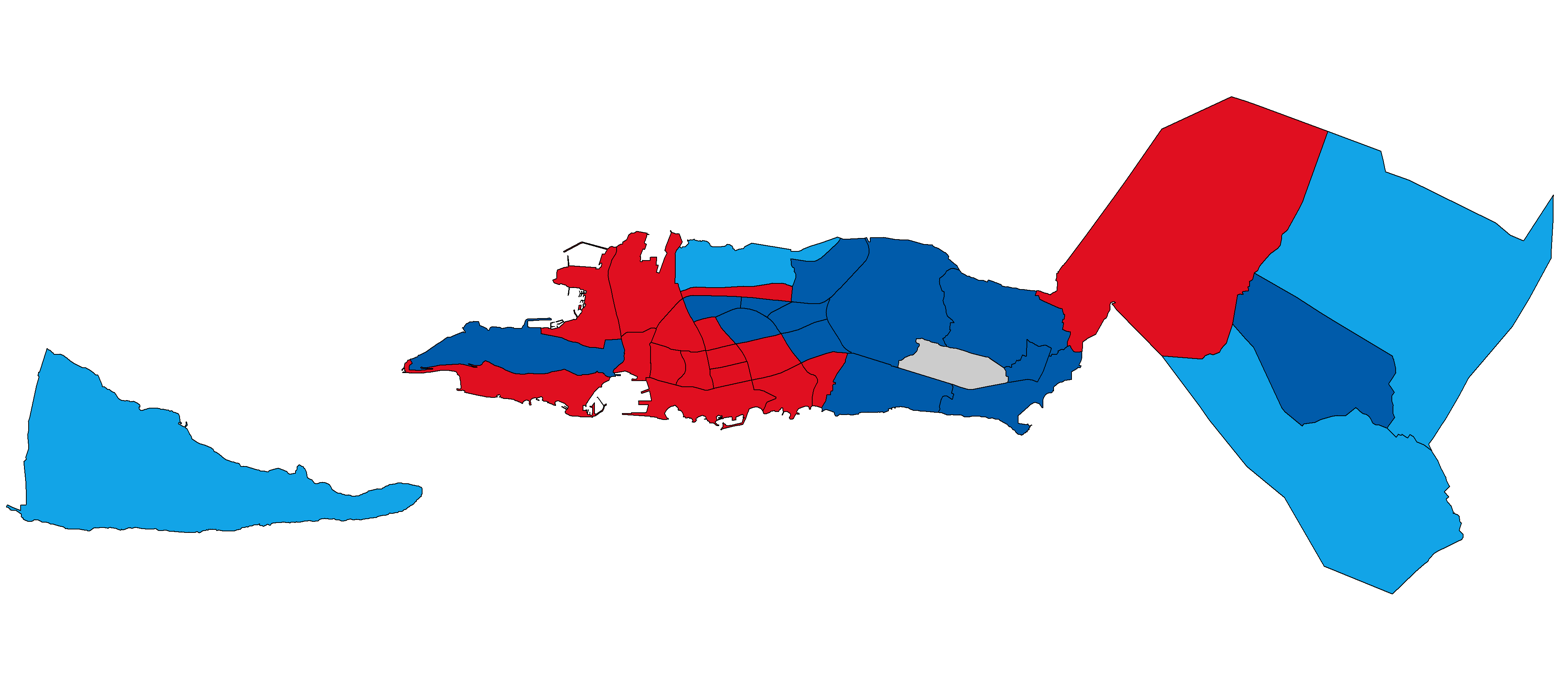
Results of the Split Council election: the party with the majority of votes in each district: Social Democratic Party of Croatia Croatian Democratic Union Croatian Civic Party Independent

Party	Votes	%	Seats
SDP–HNS–HSU	16,552	23.44	11
HDZ–HČSP–HSLS–HSP AS–HKDU–BUZ	14,990	21.22	10
HGS–HSS–SU	8,762	12.41	5
Marijana Puljak Independent List	6,534	9.25	4
Ivan Grubišić Independent List	5,633	7.98	3
Anđelka Visković Independent List	3,918	5.55	2
AHU–ASH–SSU–SP–ZS–SUH	1,858	2.63	0
Croatian Growth	1,829	2.59	0
Tomislav Zaninović Independent List	1,616	2.29	0
A-HSP–HSP	1,446	2.05	0
Dragan Markovina Independent List	1,390	1.97	0
Sana Bilač Independent List	1,353	1.92	0
Croatian Labourists – Labour Party	1,154	1.63	0
Youth Action	1,109	1.57	0
Croatian Democratic Liberation Alliance of Dalmatia	1,049	1.49	0
Nenad Gaćina Independent List	391	0.55	0
Socialist Labour Party of Croatia	221	0.31	0
Authentic Croatian Peasant Party	205	0.29	0
Dalmatian Democrats	198	0.28	0
Socialist Party of Croatia	174	0.25	0
Adriatic Social Democrats	148	0.21	0
Zvonimir Pavlinović Independent List	96	0.14	0
Total	70,626	100.00	35
Valid votes	70,626	97.18	
Invalid/blank votes	2,046	2.82	
Total votes	72,672	100.00	
Registered voters/turnout	152,290	47.72	
Source: State Election Committee
