= Petar Vitezica =

Yugoslav politician

Mayor of Split
- In office October 1943 – May 1944
- Preceded by: Josip Smodlaka
- Succeeded by: Umberto Fabris

Petar Vitezica (Croatian pronunciation: [pětar ʋǐtezit͡sa]) (15 February 1903 - 4 May 1970) was a Yugoslav politician and Mayor of Split from 1943 to 1944 during World War II. Prior to this, starting in 1941, he had been a prison doctor.
