= Umberto Fabris =

Yugoslav politician

Mayor of Split
- In office May 1944 – 25 November 1944
- Preceded by: Petar Vitezica
- Succeeded by: Ante Mrduljaš

Umberto Fabris, also known as Humbert Fabris, was a Yugoslav politician and Mayor of Split during World War II in 1944. He was later president of the football team HNK Hajduk Split, from October 1945 to December 1946, and from November 1947 to January 1949.

Preceded by Janko Rodin	President of Hajduk Split; October 1945 – December 1946; November 1947 – January 1949	Succeeded by Ivo Raić
