= Andro Krstulović Opara =

Croatian politician and art historian

Mayor of Split
- In office 14 June 2017 – 7 June 2021
- Deputy: Jelena Hrgović Tomaš; Nino Vela
- Preceded by: Ivo Baldasar; Branka Ramljak (Acting)
- Succeeded by: Ivica Puljak

Personal details
- Born: 22 May 1967 (age 59) Split, SR Croatia, SFR Yugoslavia
- Party: HDZ
- Spouse: Daniela Marasović (m. 1987)
- Children: 3
- Education: University of Zagreb; Diplomatic Academy of Vienna
- Awards: Order of Danica Hrvatska

Andro Krstulović Opara (born 22 May 1967) is a Croatian politician and art historian who served as Mayor of Split from 2017 to 2021.

== Early life and education ==
Opara was born on 22 May 1967 in Split where he finished elementary and high school, after which he enrolled at the Zagreb Faculty of Humanities and Social Sciences from which he graduated in art history and archaeology. In 1993 he graduated from the Diplomatic Academy of Vienna and in 1995 from the Diplomatic Academy of the Ministry of Foreign and European Affairs. Opara is currently enrolled in the doctoral program Building heritage at the Zagreb Faculty of Architecture.

== Political career ==
Opara was elected to the Croatian Parliament at the 1990 first multi-party elections as one of the three representatives of students at the Council of Associated Labour (one of Parliaments' three houses that does not exist anymore), but in reality he represented Youth of the Croatian Democratic Union.

In 1992 he was named head of Cabinet of the Minister of Science and Education, and in 1993 senior adviser to the deputy foreign minister. Between 1995 and 2000, Krstulović Opara served as consul adviser at the Croatian Consulate General in Milan. In 2002 he became a senior diplomat – adviser for the Croatian relations with Italy and the Holy See at the Croatian Foreign Ministry. Between 2002 and 2008 he served as a senior adviser – conservatory of cultural property at the Split Conservation Department of the Ministry of Culture.

In 2008 Opara become a senior curator and director of the Museums of Ivan Meštrović in Split, and in 2015, adviser for social activities to the President Kolinda Grabar-Kitarović. He was re-elected to the Croatian Parliament at the 2016 parliamentary election. At the 2017 local elections, he was elected Mayor of Split.

== Personal life ==
Opara is married to Daniela Marasović with whom he has three children; two daughters and one son. His wife specialized internal medicine and subspecialized rheumatology and clinical immunology. She works at Split Clinical Hospital Center and as an assistant professor at the Medical School of the University of Split. Krstulović Opara speaks Croatian, English and Italian fluently. He is a member of the Croatian Archaeological Society, Matica hrvatska, Split Literary Circle, HVK Gusar Split and Rotary club Split.

On 23 January 2018, it was reported that Opara suffered from malignant cancer of skin and mucous which spread to the brain. He is undergoing a treatment.

Political offices
Preceded by Ivo Baldasar	Mayor of Split; 2017–2021	Succeeded by Ivica Puljak
