= Ivo Amulić =

Yugoslav politician

Mayor of Split
- In office 6 April 1942 – 15 May 1942
- Preceded by: Josip Brkić
- Succeeded by: Ivo Tijardović

Ivo Amulić (11 March 1911 in Kostanje, Kroatia – 26 August 1973 in Zagreb, Croatia) was a Yugoslav politician and Mayor of Split briefly in 1942 during World War II.
