= Promet Split =

Transport company in Croatia

Promet Split (English: Traffic Split) is the transit authority responsible for public transport in Split (the second largest city in Croatia) and parts of the surrounding Split Metropolitan area. It was founded on March 13, 1948 in Split.

In 1965 the company "Iskra" from Supetar was merged with "Promet", whereby "Promet" took over the entire public transport on the island of Brač.

In 1996, the public utility company "Promet" was transformed into a limited liability company.

In 2008 the company upgraded its fleet with the latest MAN and Mercedes-Benz models.

Starting April 1, 2018 "Promet" introduces free Wi-Fi network service.
