= Ivo Baldasar =

Croatian politician, former mayor of Split

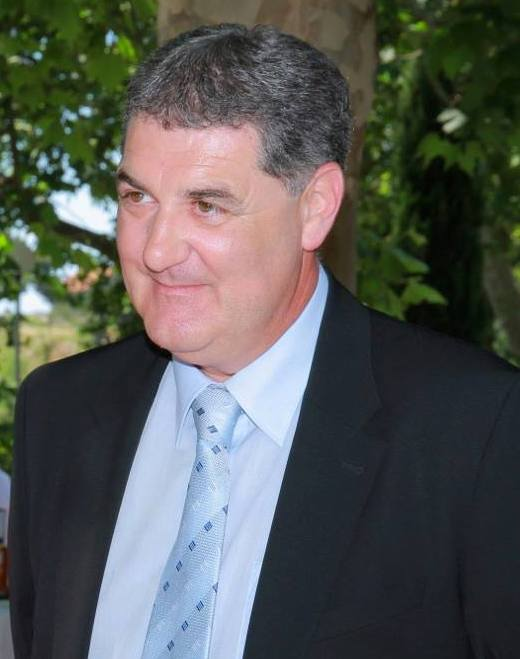

Mayor of Split
- In office 7 June 2013 – 28 March 2017
- Preceded by: Željko Kerum
- Succeeded by: Branka Ramljak (Acting); Andro Krstulović Opara

Personal details
- Born: 5 August 1958 (age 68) Split, PR Croatia, FPR Yugoslavia
- Party: STS (2017–present); BM 365 (2016); SDP (1998–2016)
- Spouse: Snježana Baldasar
- Education: University of Split

Ivo Baldasar (born 5 August 1958) is a Croatian politician who served as Mayor of Split from 2013 until his resignation in March 2017. He was a member of the Social Democratic Party (SDP) until he was thrown out of the party in 2016. After that, he joined forces with the Bandić Milan 365 party. In 2017 he formed his own party called The Split Party.

== Political career ==
Baldasar spent his early career working as a lawyer within the tourism industry, concentrating mainly on maritime business. He joined the SDP in 1998, and in 2009 became a city councilor for the city of Split. In 2012 he became the party's candidate for mayor of the city, winning the second round of elections over Vjekoslav Ivanišević to become the 71st mayor of Split.

On 9 May 2014 Baldasar attended the ceremony of revealing the monument to the 9th Battalion "Rafael Boban" of the Croatian Defence Forces (Croatian: Hrvatske obrambene snage or HOS) that participated in the defense of Croatian during the Croatian War of Independence. His presence was criticised because of the Ustaše inspired symbolism used by the HOS, including naming their unit after Rafael Boban who commanded the Black Legion, dressing in black uniforms and using the Za dom spremni motto. Some news reports suggested that after the commander of the Battalion ended his speech with Za dom spremni, the gathered crowd clapped, with Baldasar allegedly, reluctantly doing the same. This was denied by Baldasar himself explaining he didn't hear anything and that he had an agreement with the organizers that such things wouldn't happen during the ceremony. He later defended his actions explaining that the members of HOS were anti-fascists in a way, because they fought against a new form of fascism during the Croatian War of Independence. He concluded that his actions were an attempt overcoming historical differences and that he would do it again.

Ahead of 2013 referendum for changing constitution so it would define marriage as being a union between a man and a woman, Baldasar urged people to vote against proposed change.

On 7 May 2016, Zoran Milanović dissolved the SDP organization in Split and thus all the party members in Split were thrown out of the party until a new chain of command is organized. This was decided in order to prevent Baldasar from running again as mayor because his controversial stances have gained him unpopularity in the city.

On 8 June 2016, he announced his collaboration with Mayor of Zagreb, Milan Bandić for the next local elections. In the 2016 parliamentary election Baldasar suffered a heavy loss winning only 303 votes. In December 2016, the city council of Split voted against his budget proposals.

In February 2017, Baldasar formed a new party called The Split Party. He also announced running again for mayor in the 2017 local elections.

On 28 March 2017, Baldasar resigned as mayor of Split after his proposals were voted down in the city council. In the 2017 Split local elections, The Split Party received only 239 votes for the city council while Ivo Baldasar finished last in the mayor race with only 553 votes.

Political offices
| Preceded by Željko Kerum | Mayor of Split; 2013 – 2017 | Succeeded by Branka Ramljak; Acting (Government Commissioner) |
