= The Split Party =

The Split Party Splitska stranka
- Leader: Ivo Baldasar
- Founded: 1 February 2017
- Headquarters: Split, Croatia
- Ideology: Populism
- Political position: Centre
- Sabor: 0 / 151
- European Parliament: 0 / 11

The Split Party (Croatian: Splitska stranka or STS) was a Croatian centrist political party, formed in February 2017. The party was established by the former mayor of Split Ivo Baldasar. Baldasar publicly said that the party is non-ideological and that it accepts members from all sides of the political spectrum. The party was formed shortly after Baldasar lost his political power in the city council when his budget proposal was voted down.

In the 2017 Split local elections, The Split Party received 239 votes for the city council while Ivo Baldasar finished last in the mayor race with 553 votes.
