= Ivan Kuret =

Croatian politician (born 1971)

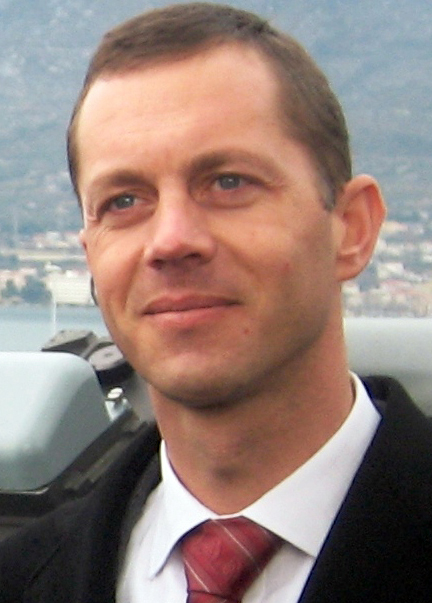

Mayor of Split
- In office 17 July 2007 – 1 June 2009
- Preceded by: Zvonimir Puljić
- Succeeded by: Željko Kerum

Personal details
- Born: 22 December 1971 (age 54) Split, SR Croatia, SFR Yugoslavia
- Party: Croatian Democratic Union
- Education: University of Split
- Profession: Engineer

Ivan Kuret (born 22 December 1971) is a Croatian politician who served as the 69th Mayor of Split from 2007 to 2009.

He graduated from the University of Split with a degree in engineering. He is a member of the centre-right Croatian Democratic Union (HDZ). He was elected the mayor on 17 July 2007, after the city council revoked confidence in his predecessor, Zvonimir Puljić. He was succeeded on 1 June 2009 by Željko Kerum.

Kuret was also a sailor, and competed in the men's 470 event at the 1996 Summer Olympics.

Political offices
| Preceded by Zvonimir Puljić | Mayor of Split; 17 July 2007 - 1 June 2009 | Succeeded by Željko Kerum |
