= 2009 Split local elections =

Local elections in Croatia

2009 Split mayoral election
- 17 and 31 May 2009
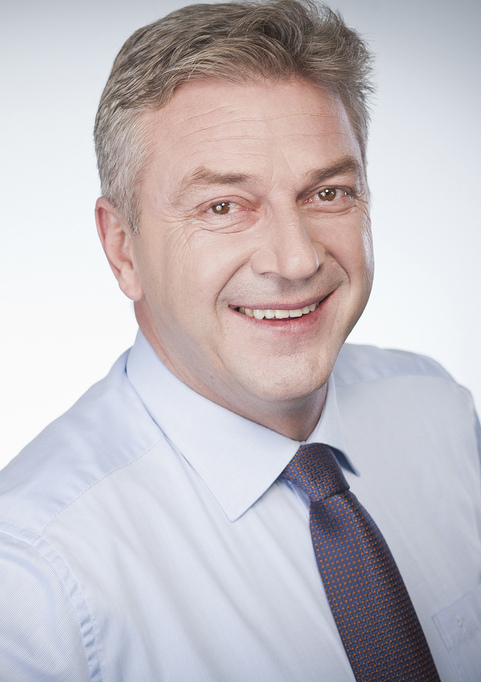
Candidate	Željko Kerum	Ranko Ostojić
Party	Independent	SDP
Popular vote	40,479	29,003
Percentage	56.87%	40.75%
Mayor before election
Ivan Kuret
HDZ
Elected mayor
Željko Kerum
Independent

The 2009 local elections were held in Split, Croatia on 17 and 31 May 2009.

The incumbent HDZ mayor Ivan Kuret was running for a full four-year term after he was appointed mayor on 17 July 2007 after the former mayor Zvonimir Puljić was impeached by the city council.

== Mayoral election ==
Candidates		First round		Runoff	
Candidate	Sustaining Party	Votes	%	Votes	%
Željko Kerum	Independent	30,227	40.21	40,479	56.87
Ranko Ostojić	Social Democratic Party of Croatia; Croatian People's Party - Liberal Democrats; Croatian Party of Pensioners; Democratic Centre	26,099	34.72	29,003	40.75
Ivan Kuret	Croatian Democratic Union; Croatian Peasant Party; Croatian Social Liberal Party	12,840	17.08		
Luka Podrug	Croatian Pure Party of Rights; Croatian Party of Rights; Croatian Christian Democratic Union	3,016	4.01		
Mate Buljubašić	Social Democratic Action of Croatia; Split Party of Pensioners	1,513	2.01		
Valid votes:		73,695	98.11	69,482	97.65
Invalid votes:		1,422	1.89	1,669	2.35
Turnout:		75,164	46.76	71,177	44.28
Expected voters:		160,738		160,753	
The percentages of votes from each candidate are calculated from number of valid voters The percentages of valid and invalid votes are calculated from the turnout number The turnout percentage is calculated from the number of expected voters
Source: State Election Committee (Državno izborno povjerenstvo)

== Council election ==
Party list	Votes	%	Seats	%
Željko Kerum independent list	20,337	27.71	9	36
Social Democratic Party of Croatia; Croatian People's Party - Liberal Democrats; Croatian Party of Pensioners; Democratic Centre	17,479	23.77	8	32
Croatian Democratic Union; Croatian Peasant Party; Croatian Social Liberal Party	10,394	14.13	4	16
Croatian Pure Party of Rights; Croatian Party of Rights; Croatian Christian Democratic Union	4,169	5.67	2	8
Nikola Grabić independent list	4,017	5.46	1	4
Ljubica Vrdoljak independent list	3,835	5.22	1	4
Total:	73,535	97.89	25	100
Invalid votes:	1,585	2.11		
Turnout:	75,158	46.76		
Expected voters:	160,738			
The percentages of votes from each list are calculated from number of valid voters The percentages of valid and invalid votes are calculated from the turnout number The turnout percentage is calculated from the number of expected voters
Source: State Election Committee (Državno izborno povjerenstvo)
