= Autonomous Regional Party =

Autonomous Regional Party (Croatian: Autonomna regionalna stranka, ARS) is a former regional political party in Primorje-Gorski Kotar County of Croatia.

== Sources ==
- Cijela Autonomna regionalna stranka prešla u HNS (in Croatian)
