= Željko Kerum =

Croatian entrepreneur and politician

Mayor of Split
- In office 1 June 2009 – 7 June 2013
- Deputy: Željko Šundov
- Preceded by: Ivan Kuret
- Succeeded by: Ivo Baldasar

Member of the Croatian Parliament
- In office 22 December 2011 – 28 September 2015
- Constituency: X electoral district

President of the Croatian Civic Party
- Incumbent
- Assumed office 25 September 2009
- Preceded by: Position established

Personal details
- Born: 25 September 1960 (age 66) Muć, PR Croatia, FPR Yugoslavia
- Party: Croatian Civic Party (2009–present)
- Spouse: Anka Lalin (m. 1989; div. 2009)
- Domestic partner: Fani Horvat (2010–present)
- Children: 5
- Relatives: Nevenka Bečić (sister)
- Occupation: Politician, entrepreneur
- Profession: Mechanical technician

Željko Kerum (born 25 September 1960) is a Croatian entrepreneur and politician who served as Mayor of Split from 2009 to 2013. He was also the owner of the supermarket chain Kerum which folded in 2012.

Kerum won the 2009 election, was eliminated in the first round of the 2013 election, and lost in the run-off of the 2017 election.

== Early life ==
Kerum was born in the village of Ogorje (part of Muć) in the Dalmatian hinterland. In 1978, he graduated from a technical high School in Split and in 1981, he got his first job at the local construction company Melioracija. During his employment, he spent a year in Iraq working on military bases.

== Business career ==
He founded his own company Kerum in 1989, opening his first convenience store in 1990. In 1996, he opened his first supermarket in the Lora neighbourhood of Split. In 2003, he bought the Diokom industrial facilities (formerly known as Jugoplastika), and in 2007, he opened the Joker shopping mall, the largest in all of Dalmatia at the time. In 2012, his supermarket chain folded. During his time as Mayor of Split, he bought one of the local hotels which also folded and was later taken over by Adri Group.

== Politics ==
In the first round of the 2009 election for Mayor of Split, Kerum ran as an independent candidate and won 40.2% of the popular vote, while his closest rival won 34.7%. In the run-off, Kerum secured 56.9% of the votes, thus becoming the new mayor of Split.

In September 2009, during a live television interview on the national television talk show Nedjeljom u 2, in response to host Aleksandar Stanković's question if Serb businessmen were welcome in Croatia Kerum said, 'If it were up to me I would not let them, because these people have never brought us anything good in the past nor will they ever do so, and same goes for Montenegrins - whoever does business with them will end up with a loss'. (Note: "Zato što nam Srbi nikad nisu dobro donijeli, pa neće ni sada. Ne samo oni nego i Crnogorci i tkogod s njima, ovaj, poslije neće dobro proći.") Asked further by Stanković if he would accept a man of Serb ethnicity as a son-in-law, Kerum emphatically exclaimed, 'No! Never!'

On 16 January 2011, a group of citizens from Split organized a protest against the previously announced change to the city's urban planning regulations which would allow construction of restaurants and bars in beach areas. An investigation revealed that one of the companies which would benefit from such construction was owned by Kerum's mistress Fani Horvat. This particular project would also include destruction of a protected forest area. Kerum further caused a stir when he proposed building a 40-meter tall statue of Christ the Redeemer to rival that of Rio de Janeiro.

In 2011, he ran in Croatian parliamentary election as a candidate of the Croatian Democratic Union.

In the 2013 election, Kerum won only 19.0% of the popular vote and failed to progress to the run-off.

In the 2017 election, Kerum won 30.4% of the popular vote in the first round, but lost in the run-off, securing only 44.3% of the vote.

== Personal life ==
In 1989, Kerum married his Anka Lalin with whom he has a daughter and a son. In 2009, he surprised the public by announcing he was divorcing his wife to be with his pregnant mistress Fani Horvat, who was nearly 25 years his junior. The media attacked him for hypocritical behavior, as he had always presented himself as a supporter of traditional values and of a conservative world view which does not look favorably upon extramarital affairs.

Kerum has been known to own expensive cars including a Hummer, a Mercedes S500, a BMW 7, a Maybach 62, a Ferrari F430, and a Ferrari 599 GTB Fiorano. His Cessna Citation X, a business jet worth approximately $17 million, is the most expensive privately owned aircraft in Croatia.

== Notes ==
Party political offices
Preceded by Office established	Leader of the Croatian Civic Party; 2009–present	Incumbent
Political offices
Preceded by Ivan Kuret	Mayor of Split; 2009–2013	Succeeded by Ivo Baldasar
