= Croatian Civic Party =

Croatian Civic Party Hrvatska građanska stranka
- Abbreviation: HGS
- Leader: Željko Kerum
- Founder: Željko Kerum
- Founded: 25 September 2009
- Headquarters: Split
- Ideology: Right-wing populism
- Political position: Right-wing
- Religion: Christianity
- Colours: Light blue
- Sabor: 0 / 151
- European Parliament: 0 / 12
- Split City Council: 2 / 31

Website
- www.hgs.com.hr

Croatian Civic Party (Croatian: Hrvatska građanska stranka or HGS) is a right-wing political party in Croatia. It was established in September 2009 by Željko Kerum, an entrepreneur and mayor of Split after he won the mayoral elections as an independent candidate. During his mayoral campaign, he often criticized political parties. Between 2009 and 2013, it was the ruling party in the city of Split in coalition with the far-right Croatian Pure Party of Rights (HČSP). For the 2011 elections, the party formed a pre-election coalition with the Croatian Democratic Union for the two Dalmatian constituencies and won 2 seats in the parliament for himself and his sister Nevenka Bečić. In the parliamentary 2015 elections, the party won only 2234 votes in the two Dalmatian constituencies and became a non-parliamentary party

== Electoral history ==
Election	In coalition with	Votes won (coalition totals)	Percentage	Seats won (HGS only)	Change	Government
2011	HDZ-DC	548,199	23.5%	2 / 151	▲2	Opposition
2015	None	2,234	0.10%	0 / 151	▼2	Extraparliamentary
2020	None	7,399	0.44%	0 / 151	Steady	Extraparliamentary
