= Elections in the Social Democratic Party of Croatia =

Elections in Croatia

Since its founding in 1990, elections within the Social Democratic Party of Croatia were held numerous times.

== 2007 leadership election ==
The Social Democratic Party of Croatia 2007 leadership election following the death of longtime leader Ivica Račan was held on 2 June 2007. Deputy leader Željka Antunović served as the acting leader and ran for a full term. Little known party spokesperson Zoran Milanović ran as an outsider and reformist promising much needed modernization of the party. Other candidates included Zagreb mayor Milan Bandić and former Foreign Affairs Minister Tonino Picula. Milanović pulled out an unexpected win in the first ballot, but failed to achieve an outright majority. He defeated Antunović in the second ballot and became the leader of the party.

=== Results ===
Candidate	First round		Runoff	
Candidate	Votes	%	Votes	%
Zoran Milanović	592	38.6	828	55.1
Željka Antunović	381	24.8	675	44.9
Milan Bandić	313	20.4		
Tonino Picula	248	16.2		
Delegate votes:	1,534	100	1,503	100
Source: First round, Second round

== 2008 leadership election ==
The Social Democratic Party of Croatia 2008 leadership election to elect the leader of the party was held on 11 May 2008. The incumbent leader Zoran Milanović had first been elected only a year earlier, but lost a close race in the 2007 general election. Davorko Vidović and Dragan Kovačević hoped to unseat the incumbent. Milanović was easily reelected in the first ballot with almost 80 percent of the delegate vote.

=== Results ===
Candidate	Votes	%
Zoran Milanović	1,389	78.9
Davorko Vidović	208	11.8
Dragan Kovačević	164	9.3
Delegate votes:	1,761	100
Source: Official result

== 2012 leadership election ==
The Social Democratic Party of Croatia 2012 leadership election to elect the leader of the party was held on 12 May 2012. The incumbent leader and Prime Minister Zoran Milanović ran for his third term since first being elected in 2007 and was unopposed following the party's landslide victory in the 2011 general election. A total of 38,887 party members were eligible to vote of which an estimated 61% turned out. Zoran Milanović was easily reelected receiving 23,554 votes. 179 votes were invalid. This was the first leadership election in any party in Croatia that was held with all party members being eligible to vote.

== April 2016 leadership election ==
The Social Democratic Party of Croatia 2016 leadership election to elect the leader of the party were held on 2 April 2016. All party members were eligible to vote. Zoran Milanović remained the President of the SDP with 62% of the vote.

Zoran Milanović the incumbent leader and former Prime Minister ran for his fourth term since first being elected in 2007 and was opposed by Zlatko Komadina the prefect of Primorje-Gorski Kotar County.

According to the Statute of the SDP, the candidates had to collect 1,000 signatures of support of members of the party for the candidacy to be valid. Komadina collected about 5,200 signatures and Milanović collected about 11,000 signatures. The third candidate Dusko Polovina failed to collect the required 1,000 signatures of support.

=== Result ===
Candidate
Candidate	Votes		%
Zoran Milanović ✓	12,429		60,16%
Zlatko Komadina	8,231		39,84%
Total votes:	20,689	Turnout:	55,05%

== November 2016 leadership election ==
=== Results ===
Candidate	First round		Runoff	
Candidate	Votes	%	Votes	%
Davor Bernardić	8,409	45.82	11,412	64.54
Ranko Ostojić	4,260	23.21	6,270	35.46
Orsat Miljenić	3,160	17.22		
Tonino Picula	2,088	11.38		
Karolina Leaković	223	1.22		
Gordana Sobol	172	0.94		
Vesna Škulić	41	0.22		
Votes:	18,405	100	17,778	100

== 2020 leadership election ==
After bad result on 2020 Parliamentary elections and resignation of party leader Davor Bernardić, Social Democratic Party held new leadership election on 26 September 2020. Five candidates were running for the position of party leader, 17 candidates for members of presidency and 103 candidates for main board. Second round was held on 3 October 2020 between Peđa Grbin and Željko Kolar, with Grbin winning and becoming new leader of the party and leader of opposition.

Candidate	First round		Runoff	
Candidate	Votes	%	Votes	%
Peđa Grbin	3,573	41.23	5,143	64.34
Željko Kolar	2,212	25.53	2,788	34.88
Ranko Ostojić	1,511	17.44		
Mirela Ahmetović	1,286	14.84		
Marino Percan	50	0.58		
Invalid/blank votes:	34	0.39	62	0.78
Votes:	8,666	100.00	7,993	100.00
Registered voters:	11,585	74.80	11,585	68.99

== 2024 leadership election ==
The internal party elections are set for 14 September 2024. Election were called follow the poor parliamentary and European elections results and finally the resignation of party leader Peđa Grbin. Ranko Ostojić, party vice president and former Minister of the Interior (2011–2016) withdrew his candidacy after Zoran Paunović's candidacy was confirmed. Siniša Hajdaš Dončić became president after the members elected him by majority vote in the second round held on 22 September 2024.

Confirmed candidates:

- Siniša Hajdaš Dončić – party vice president, former Minister of Maritime Affairs, Transport and Infrastructure (2012–2016)
- Sanja Major – vice president of the SDP Women's Forum
- Mladen Kešer – Mayor of Kalnik
- Mirando Mrsić – former Minister of Labour and Pension System (2011–2016)
- Zoran Paunović – Mayor of Makarska

Candidate	First round		Runoff	
Candidate	Votes	%	Votes	%
Siniša Hajdaš Dončić	4,189	48.78	4,447	56.46
Zoran Paunović	1,773	20.65	3,430	43.54
Mladen Kešer	903	10.51		
Mirando Mrsić	869	10.12		
Sanja Major	856	9.97		
Invalid/blank votes:	66	0.76	50	0.63
Votes:	8,654	39.96	7,927	36.63
Registered voters:	21,657		21,638	
