= Opposition (Croatia) =

Non-governing parties in Parliament

Leader of the Opposition
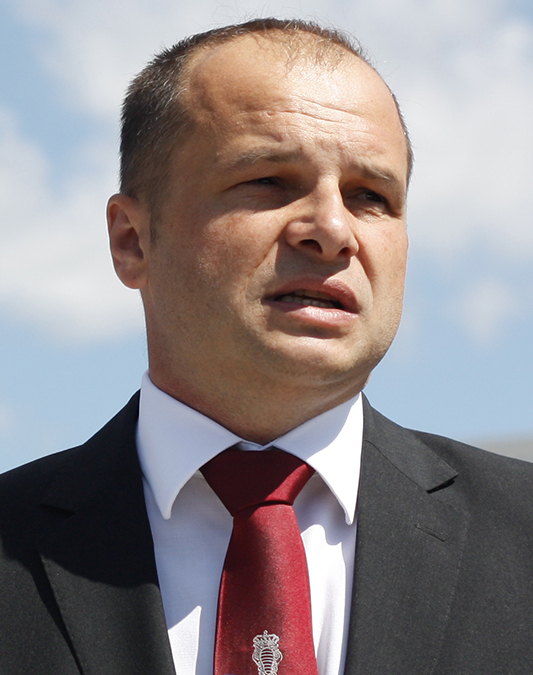
- Incumbent; Siniša Hajdaš Dončić since 21 September 2024
- Term length: While leader of the largest political party not in government

In Croatia, the Opposition (Croatian: Oporba) comprises all political parties represented in the Croatian Parliament that are not part of the Government which is supported by the parliamentary majority.

The Leader of the Opposition (Croatian: Šef oporbe) is an unofficial, seldom used title held by the leader of the largest party with no representatives within the government. Where one party wins outright this is usually the leader of the second largest political party in the Parliament (usually the Croatian Democratic Union (HDZ) or the Social Democratic Party (SDP)).

The current Leader of the Opposition is Siniša Hajdaš Dončić, president of the SDP, who took up the role on 21 September 2024, after winning the elections for the head of the Social Democratic Party.

== 1990s ==
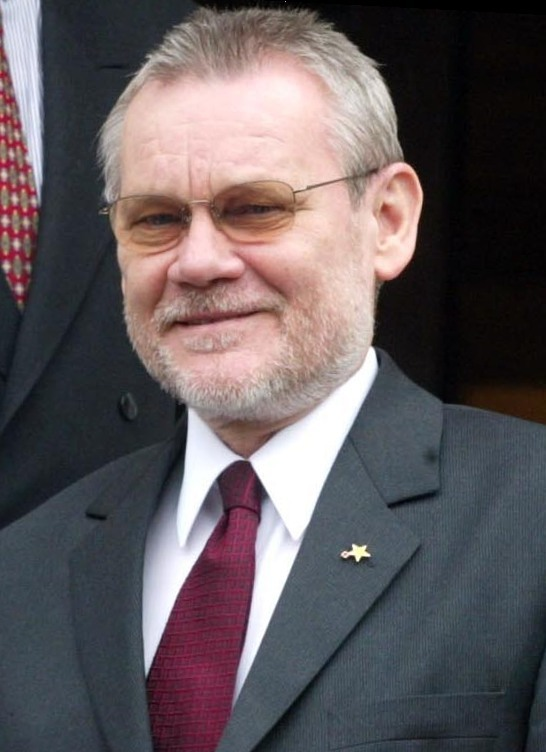
Ivica Račan

Ivica Račan of the Party of Democratic Changes led the opposition in 1990 and 1991.

The Cabinet of Franjo Gregurić formed in 1991 was a National Unity Government.

Dražen Budiša of the Croatian Social Liberal Party led the opposition between 1992 and 2000.

== 2000s ==
Vladimir Šeks led the Croatian Democratic Union in opposition until the election of Ivo Sanader in 2000.

Ivica Račan led the opposition between 2003 and 2007. Željka Antunović became the head of SDP after his death, until Zoran Milanović was elected.

== 6th assembly of Sabor ==
In the Sixth assembly of the Croatian Parliament (2007–2011), the parties in Sabor that included the opposition were:

- Social Democratic Party
- Croatian People's Party – Liberal Democrats
- Istrian Democratic Assembly
- Croatian Democratic Assembly of Slavonia and Baranja
- Croatian Party of Pensioners
- Croatian Party of Rights
- Croatian Labourists – Labour Party

The leader of the opposition was Zoran Milanović, leader of the Social Democratic Party of Croatia.

== 7th assembly of Sabor ==
In the Seventh assembly of the Croatian Parliament (2011–2015), the parties in Sabor that include the opposition were:

- Croatian Democratic Union
- Croatian Labourists – Labour Party
- Croatian Democratic Assembly of Slavonia and Baranja
- Independent list of Ivan Grubišić
- Croatian Citizen Party
- Croatian Party of Rights dr. Ante Starčević
- Croatian Peasant Party
- Democratic Centre

In 2011 Jadranka Kosor led the Croatian Democratic Union in opposition, until the 2012 election of Tomislav Karamarko.

== 8th assembly of Sabor ==
In the Eight assembly of the Croatian Parliament (2015–2016), the parties in Sabor that include the opposition are:

- Social Democratic Party
- Croatian People's Party – Liberal Democrats
- Croatian Labourists – Labour Party
- Istrian Democratic Assembly
- Croatian Party of Pensioners
- Croatian Democratic Alliance of Slavonia and Baranja
- People's Party - Reformists
- Human Blockade

Zoran Milanović led the opposition in 2016.

== 9th assembly of Sabor ==
In the Ninth assembly of the Croatian Parliament (2016–2020), the parties in Sabor that include the opposition are:

- Social Democratic Party
- Istrian Democratic Assembly
- Human Blockade
- Croatian Party of Pensioners
- Croatian Democratic Alliance of Slavonia and Baranja
- Bridge of Independent Lists

Zoran Milanović led the opposition until the November 2016 election of Davor Bernardić as the new leader of the Social Democratic Party.

== 10th assembly of Sabor ==
In the Tenth assembly of the Croatian Parliament (2020–24), the parties in Sabor that included the opposition were:

- Social Democratic Party
- Istrian Democratic Assembly
- The Bridge
- Homeland Movement
- We can!
- Croatian Sovereignists
- Social Democrats (since 9 July 2022)

In 2020, Zlatko Komadina headed SDP until the election of Peđa Grbin.

A new party called the Social Democrats was founded in July 2022, and it immediately became the largest opposition party in parliament.

== 11th assembly of Sabor ==
In the Eleventh assembly of the Croatian Parliament (2024–), the parties in Sabor that include the opposition are:

- SDP (37)
- We Can! (10)
- The Bridge (8) (Note: The Bridge (7); Independent Josip Jurčević)
- Centre-NPS (4) (Note: Centre (2); NPS (2))
- DOMiNO-HS (4) (Note: DOMiNO (3); HS (1))
- HSS-GLAS-DO i SIP (3) (Note: HSS (1); GLAS (1); DO i SIP (1))
- Independents' club (3) (Note: Nino Raspudić; Marija Selak Raspudić; Dario Zurovec)
- SDSS (3) (Note: SDSS represents the Serbian national minority)
- IDS (2) (Note: IDS (2))

In 2024, Siniša Hajdaš Dončić was elected the new head of the SDP.

== See also ==
- Politics of Croatia
