= Davor Bernardić =

Croatian politician and physicist (born 1980)

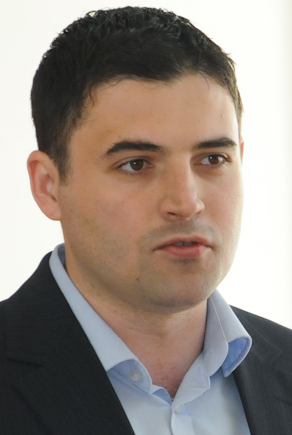

President of the Social Democratic Party
- In office 26 November 2016 – 6 July 2020
- Preceded by: Zoran Milanović
- Succeeded by: Peđa Grbin; Zlatko Komadina (Acting)

Leader of the Opposition
- In office 26 November 2016 – 6 July 2020
- Prime Minister: Andrej Plenković
- Preceded by: Zoran Milanović
- Succeeded by: Peđa Grbin; Zlatko Komadina (Acting)

Member of the Croatian Parliament for 1st electoral district
- In office 11 January 2008 – 16 May 2024
- Preceded by: Milan Bandić
- Succeeded by: Branko Kolarić

President of the SDP Youth Forum
- In office 2008–2010
- Preceded by: Dan Špicer
- Succeeded by: Saša Đujić

Personal details
- Born: 5 January 1980 (age 46) Zagreb, SR Croatia, SFR Yugoslavia
- Party: Independent (2021–2022, 2024–present)
- Other political affiliations: Social Democratic Party (1998–2021); Social Democrats (2022–2024)
- Spouse: Irena Coljak (m. 2011; div. 2019)
- Parents: Damir Bernardić; Dragica Tešo
- Education: University of Zagreb

Davor Bernardić (born 5 January 1980) is a Croatian physicist and politician who served as the president of the Social Democratic Party from 2016 to 2020. He also served as one of four SDP vice-presidents, leader of the SDP's Zagreb branch, and president of the SDP Youth Forum. Bernardić has been elected to the Croatian Parliament five times, representing the 1st electoral district from 2008 to 2024.

== Early life and education ==
Bernardić was born in Zagreb on 5 January 1980 to civil servant Damir Bernardić and nurse Dragica (née Tešo). His paternal grandfather's brother Ivan Bernardić was a notable member of the Croatian Peasant Party who was sentenced to long-term prison sentences in the Kingdom of Yugoslavia, the Independent State of Croatia and the SFR Yugoslavia because of his political activism. His grandfather Josip was also prosecuted by the communists so he had to emigrate to Austria, where he died. His maternal grandparents were members of the Yugoslav Partisans.

Having grown up in modest circumstances and wanting to help his parents financially by learning vocation, after finishing elementary school he enrolled in the Nikola Tesla First Technical School. He showed interest in mathematics and physics and in 1996 he became national champion in physics and competed for International Physics Olympics. At the national competition in 1997 he came in second, and in 1998 national championship first. He started working at the age of 14. His father was participant of the Croatian War of Independence, and died in 1998.

After finishing high school, Bernardić enrolled in the Zagreb Faculty of Science and since he was one of the best students he got a Nacional weekly scholarship which was handed to him by prime minister Ivica Račan. He was proclaimed a top student during his studies. In 2009, he became a research fellow at the postgraduate doctoral studies of physics at the Zagreb Faculty of Science. He also reported doctoral thesis in the Senate of the University of Zagreb, at the Zagreb Faculty of Economics and Business, on the topic of economics education with specialization in urban economics.

== Political career ==
Bernardić became involved in politics in 1998 by joining the Social Democratic Party at the age of 18. He was actively involved in the SDP's Zagreb branch by having served as president of the Youth Forum branch (2005–2007), member of the executive board (2005–2009) and member of the Zagreb Assembly (2007–2009). From 2008 to 2010, Bernardić served as president of the party's Youth Forum, and from 2008 to 2012 as member of the SDP's main board.

On 5 May 2010, Bernardić defeated Ivo Jelušić (at the time deputy mayor of Zagreb), winning 63.3 per cent of the votes of those SDP members who cast their votes, and had become leader of the SDP's Zagreb branch. He also served as president of the SDP's Councilor Club in the Zagreb Assembly. On 20 October 2013, he was re-elected as head of SDP's Zagreb branch.

Bernardić got involved in national politics in 2008 when he became MP by replacing Milan Bandić who was at the time still the SDP member. He was re-elected to the Parliament in the 2011, 2015, 2016, and 2020 parliamentary elections. In 2024, he was not elected to the Parliament. After the election, he left the Social Democrats and from August 2024, he was a candidate for mayor of Zagreb, running on an independent platform. In the 2025 mayoral election, he didn't advance to the second round of voting and incumbent mayor Tomislav Tomašević ultimately won in the second round.

Bernardić married an economist Irena Coljak on 29 April 2011, but it was revealed in October 2019, the couple got divorced. During high school, he played basketball, judo, karate and kung-fu. He speaks English fluently, and is learning French.

Bernardić is a Roman Catholic who believes that the faith is a personal matter, and that everyone should be free to express it in, according to themselves, the most appropriate manner, adding that social democrats should stand for solidarity, human dignity and equality "which are the values on which Christian doctrine is based." He has undertaken a pilgrimage to Marija Bistrica.

Party political offices
Preceded by Zoran Milanović	Leader of the Social Democratic Party; 2016–2020	Succeeded by Zlatko Komadina; Acting
Political offices
Preceded by Zoran Milanović	Leader of the Opposition; 2016–2020	Succeeded by Zlatko Komadina; Acting
