= Zlatko Komadina =

Croatian politician (born 1958)

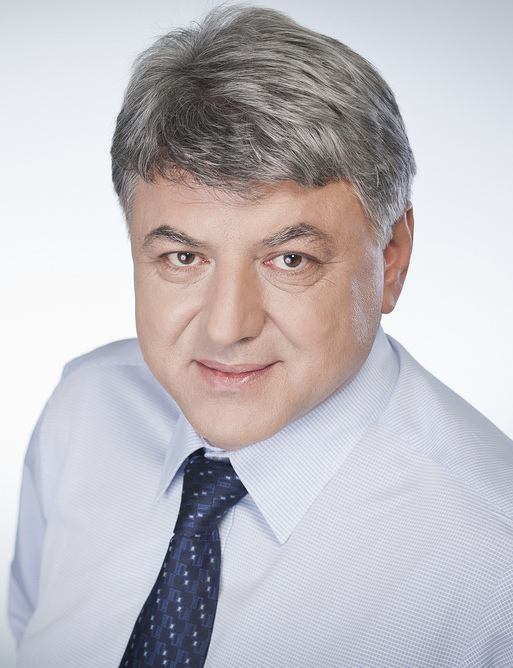

Leader of the Opposition Acting
- In office 6 July 2020 – 3 October 2020
- Prime Minister: Andrej Plenković
- Preceded by: Davor Bernardić
- Succeeded by: Peđa Grbin

President of the Social Democratic Party Acting
- In office 6 July 2020 – 3 October 2020
- Deputy: Biljana Borzan; Ranko Ostojić
- Preceded by: Davor Bernardić
- Succeeded by: Peđa Grbin

Prefect of the Primorje-Gorski Kotar County
- In office 3 June 2013 – June 2025
- Preceded by: Himself; Vidoje Vujić (acting)
- Succeeded by: Ivica Lukanović
- In office 5 July 2001 – 23 December 2011
- Preceded by: Milivoj Brozina
- Succeeded by: Vidoje Vujić (acting); Himself

Minister of Maritime Affairs, Transport and Infrastructure
- In office 23 December 2011 – 4 April 2012
- Prime Minister: Zoran Milanović
- Preceded by: Božidar Kalmeta
- Succeeded by: Zdenko Antešić (acting); Siniša Hajdaš Dončić

Personal details
- Born: 24 October 1958 (age 67) Ljubljana, PR Slovenia, FPR Yugoslavia
- Party: Social Democratic Party (1990–present)
- Spouse: Branka Komadina
- Children: Sanja; Luka
- Education: University of Rijeka

Zlatko Komadina (born 24 October 1958) is a Croatian politician who has served as prefect of Primorje-Gorski Kotar County from 2013 to 2025.

Komadina resigned as Minister of Maritime Affairs, Transport and Infrastructure in the Cabinet of Zoran Milanović in April 2012, only three months into his mandate, citing health reasons.

Political offices
Preceded by Milivoj Brozina	Prefect of Primorje-Gorski Kotar County; 2001–2011	Succeeded by Vidoje Vujić (acting)
Preceded by Božidar Kalmeta	Ministry of Maritime Affairs, Transport and Infrastructure; 2012	Succeeded by Siniša Hajdaš Dončić
Preceded by Vidoje Vujić (acting)	Prefect of Primorje-Gorski Kotar County; 2013–present	Incumbent
Preceded by Davor Bernardić	Leader of the Social Democratic Party acting 2020–present	Incumbent
