= Željka Antunović =

Croatian politician

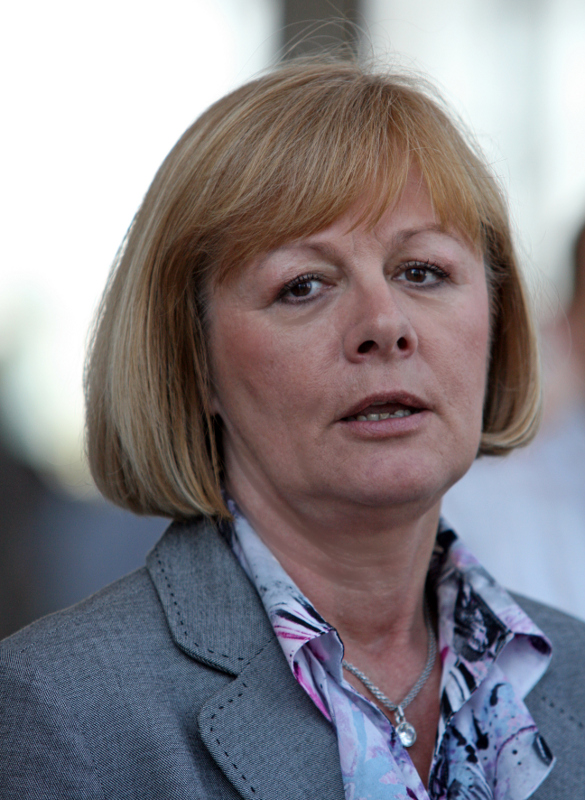
- Antunović in May 2011

Leader of the Opposition Acting
- In office 11 April 2007 – 2 June 2007
- Prime Minister: Ivo Sanader
- Preceded by: Ivica Račan
- Succeeded by: Zoran Milanović

President of the Social Democratic Party Acting
- In office 11 April 2007 – 2 June 2007
- Preceded by: Ivica Račan
- Succeeded by: Zoran Milanović

Minister of Defence
- In office 30 July 2002 – 23 December 2003
- Prime Minister: Ivica Račan
- Preceded by: Jozo Radoš
- Succeeded by: Berislav Rončević

Deputy Prime Minister of Croatia
- In office 27 January 2000 – 23 December 2003
- Prime Minister: Ivica Račan
- Preceded by: Mate Granić
- Succeeded by: Jadranka Kosor; Andrija Hebrang

Personal details
- Born: 15 September 1955 (age 71) Virovitica, PR Croatia, FPR Yugoslavia
- Party: SDH (1990–1994); SDP (1994–2013)
- Education: University of Zagreb

Željka Antunović (pronounced [ʒɛ̂ːʎka antǔːnɔʋit͡ɕ]; born 15 September 1955) is a Croatian former politician who served as acting president of the Social Democratic Party between April and June 2007, and as Minister of Defence from 2002 until 2003 in the second cabinet of Ivica Račan. She was the first and to date only female holder of the office.

== Biography ==
Born in Virovitica, Antunović entered the political scene in 1990 when she joined the Social Democrats of Croatia (SDH), a centre-left party formed after the establishment of democracy across Yugoslavia – and originally a major rival of the Social Democratic Party (SDP), who had in turn recently succeeded the League of Communists of Croatia (SKH). The SDH accepted the SDP's offer of unification, which occurred in 1994. At the Unification Congress, Antunović was co-opted into the Directorate of the SDP.

Antunović had served as a member of the Croatian Parliament from 1995 to 1999, and from 2003 onwards. At the party conference in 2000, she was elected as the deputy president of the SDP. Between 2000 and 2003, she served as Deputy Prime Minister of Croatia and was named the first woman to hold the portfolio of Defence in the second cabinet of Ivica Račan, serving from 2002 until the end of the cabinet's term in 2003.

On 31 January 2007, Račan announced that he was temporarily leaving politics for health reasons, and SDP vice-president Željka Antunović took over the leadership of the party. On 11 April, following a deterioration in his health, Račan resigned as leader of the SDP, with Antunović serving as acting party president until the next party convention. She ran for president at the party convention on 2 June 2007, together with Milan Bandić, Zoran Milanović and Tonino Picula. She was defeated by Milanović in the second round of voting.

After her retirement from politics, she started a consulting company. She took part in Ivo Josipović's campaign for the 2014–15 Croatian presidential election.
