= Ivica Račan =

Croatian politician (1944–2007)

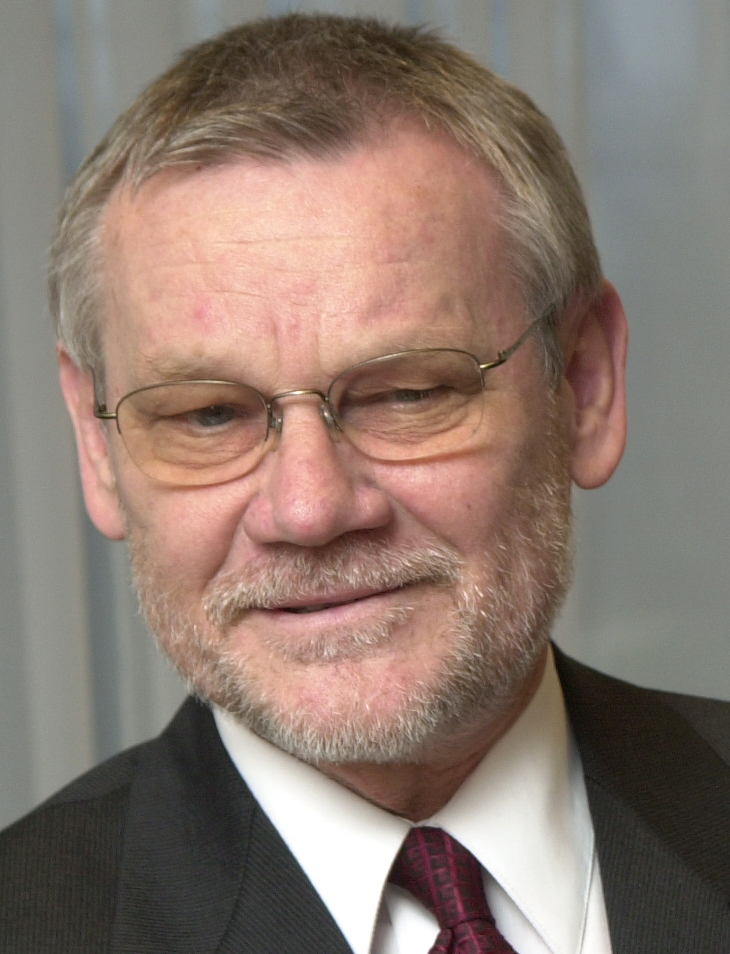
- Račan in 2003

Prime Minister of Croatia
- In office 27 January 2000 – 23 December 2003
- President: Vlatko Pavletić (Acting); Zlatko Tomčić (Acting); Stjepan Mesić
- Preceded by: Zlatko Mateša
- Succeeded by: Ivo Sanader

President of the League of Communists of Croatia
- In office 13 December 1989 – 3 November 1990
- Preceded by: Stanko Stojčević
- Succeeded by: Office abolished
Additional positions
Leader of the Opposition
In office 23 December 2003 – 11 April 2007
Prime Minister	Ivo Sanader
Preceded by	Ivo Sanader
Succeeded by	Željka Antunović (Acting); Zoran Milanović
In office 30 May 1990 – 17 July 1991
President	Franjo Tuđman
Preceded by	Office established
Succeeded by	Vacant (National unity government)
President of the Social Democratic Party
In office 3 November 1990 – 11 April 2007
Preceded by	Office established
Succeeded by	Željka Antunović (Acting); Zoran Milanović
Member of the Presidency of the League of Communists of Yugoslavia for LC Croatia
In office 28 June 1986 – 22 January 1990 Serving with Stipe Šuvar
President	Milanko Renovica; Boško Krunić; Stipe Šuvar; Milan Pančevski
Preceded by	Jure Bilić
Succeeded by	Office abolished

Personal details
- Born: 24 February 1944 Ebersbach, Nazi Germany (modern Germany)
- Died: 29 April 2007 (aged 63) Zagreb, Croatia
- Party: SKH (1961–1990); SDP (1990–2007)
- Spouses: Agata Špišić (m. 1967; div. 1984); Jelena Nenadić (m. 1990; div. 1992); Dijana Pleština (m. 1993–2007)
- Children: 2
- Education: University of Zagreb

Ivica Račan (pronounced [îʋit͡sa rât͡ʃan]; 24 February 1944 – 29 April 2007) was a Croatian politician who served as Prime Minister of Croatia from 2000 to 2003, heading two centre-left coalition governments.

Račan became the first prime minister of Croatia not to be a member of the Croatian Democratic Union, namely the opposition coalition headed by his Social Democratic Party won the 2000 parliamentary election and came to power for the first time since independence. He was the leader of the party, the successor of the League of Communists of Croatia, from 1990 to 2007.

Before becoming prime minister, Račan served in the capacity of Leader of the Opposition on two occasions: firstly, from the first multi-party elections in May 1990 until the formation of a national unity government under Franjo Gregurić in July 1991; and secondly, from his defeat in the 2003 general election by Ivo Sanader until his death on 29 April 2007.

== Early life ==
Račan was born on 24 February 1944 in Ebersbach, Nazi Germany, where his mother Marija Draženović was interned in a labor camp during World War II. He and his mother survived the Allied bombing of Dresden and were buried for days in the basement of a collapsed building. After the war, Račan returned to Croatia and spent his childhood and adolescence in Slavonski Brod, before moving to Zagreb and enrolling at the University of Zagreb. In 1970 he graduated from the Zagreb Faculty of Law.

== Political career ==
=== Early career (1961–1989) ===
Račan entered politics in the People's Republic of Croatia in 1961 as a member of the League of Communists of Croatia (SKH), the Croatian branch of the League of Communists of Yugoslavia (SKJ). He was president of the communist youth organization in the Slavonski Brod gymnasium. From 1963 to 1974 he worked for the Yugoslav institute of social research where he studied and researched the topic of Workers' self-management. In 1972, his professional political career began when he entered the central committee of the Croatian league of communists after 6 seats were made available because those 6 previous officials were involved in the 1971 Croatian Spring. He was a member of the SKH culture committee and the head ideology commissioner. From 1982 to 1986, he was director of the "Josip Broz Tito" political school in Kumrovec. In 1986 he was elected to represent SKH in the presidency of the Yugoslav league of communists in Belgrade.

In the late 1980s during the Anti-bureaucratic revolution, tensions grew between pro-Milošević and anti-Milošević supporters so in autumn 1989 the Croatian communists elected Račan as the president of SKH because he defended the rights of republic autonomies which the Milošević establishment wanted to abolish. Račan led the Croatian delegation at the 14th SKJ party congress, held in late January 1990. The congress was dominated by Slobodan Milošević's supporters and the Slovenian and Croatian delegations were continuously outvoted in trying to reach a compromise on the political future of Yugoslavia, their proposals of various political reforms and amendments to the Constitution, aiming primarily on decentralizing the federation, all being rejected. Finally the Slovenian delegation declared that they were abandoning the congress. Milošević tried to persuade Račan to stay, but Račan replied that a communist party without the Slovenes was unacceptable. Without the Croatian delegation, it was impossible to reconvene the congress. (Adam Le Bor: Milošević)

=== Opposition years (1990–1999) ===
Under his leadership, SKH re-branded themselves as the Party of Democratic Reform (Croatian: Stranka demokratskih promjena or SDP) in February 1990 and then ran in the 1990 election as SKH-SDP, winning 26 percent of the votes and coming in second behind the right-wing Croatian Democratic Union (HDZ). During the 1990 election campaign, Račan stirred some controversy when he referred to HDZ as a "party of dangerous intentions".

Although his party had lost the election, they remained the second largest party in the Sabor, and Račan thus continued his political career as the first Leader of the Opposition in the history of modern Croatia. SKH-SDP, however, quickly became a shadow of its former self – a majority of its membership, including the highest-ranking officials, defected to HDZ, while the breakup of Yugoslavia, the rebellion of ethnic Serbs and the ensuing war which broke out in 1991 further radicalised the Croatian public. In such circumstances, Račan was more concerned with the survival of his party rather than challenging Franjo Tuđman's rule, even if it meant tolerating some of Tuđman's more controversial policies, like the nationalisation of workers' owned enterprises and privatisation.

In such circumstances, Račan gave up the opposition leader title to Dražen Budiša of the Croatian Social Liberal Party (HSLS). SDP then barely managed to pass the threshold in the following 1992 general election, but it did succeed in establishing itself as the strongest social democratic option. In 1994, SDP incorporated the minor Social Democrats of Croatia (SDH) party and soon became one of the two main alternatives to Tuđman, along with HSLS. The same year, Miko Tripalo, who was chairman of the Social Democratic Action of Croatia (SDAH) tried to force an all-left party coalition on the Croatian political spectrum but Račan and the SDP head committee rejected the idea and thus later becoming the only major left party.

Following the end of the war of independence in 1995, Croatian voters were becoming more concerned with social issues, and in such circumstances, SDP gradually began to consolidate support at the expense of other opposition parties, most notably the social liberals, HSLS. This became evident in the 1995 general elections. SDP finished second in the 1997 Croatian presidential election which gave them the status of the main opposition party.

=== Premiership (2000–2003) ===
In August 1998, Račan and Budiša signed a coalition agreement and later won the 2000 elections, dislodging HDZ from power after a decade.

Following the election, Račan became Prime Minister of Croatia and formed a six-party centre-left government with ministers from SDP, HSLS, the Croatian Peasant Party (HSS), the Liberal Party (LS), the Croatian People's Party (HNS), and the Istrian Democratic Assembly (IDS).

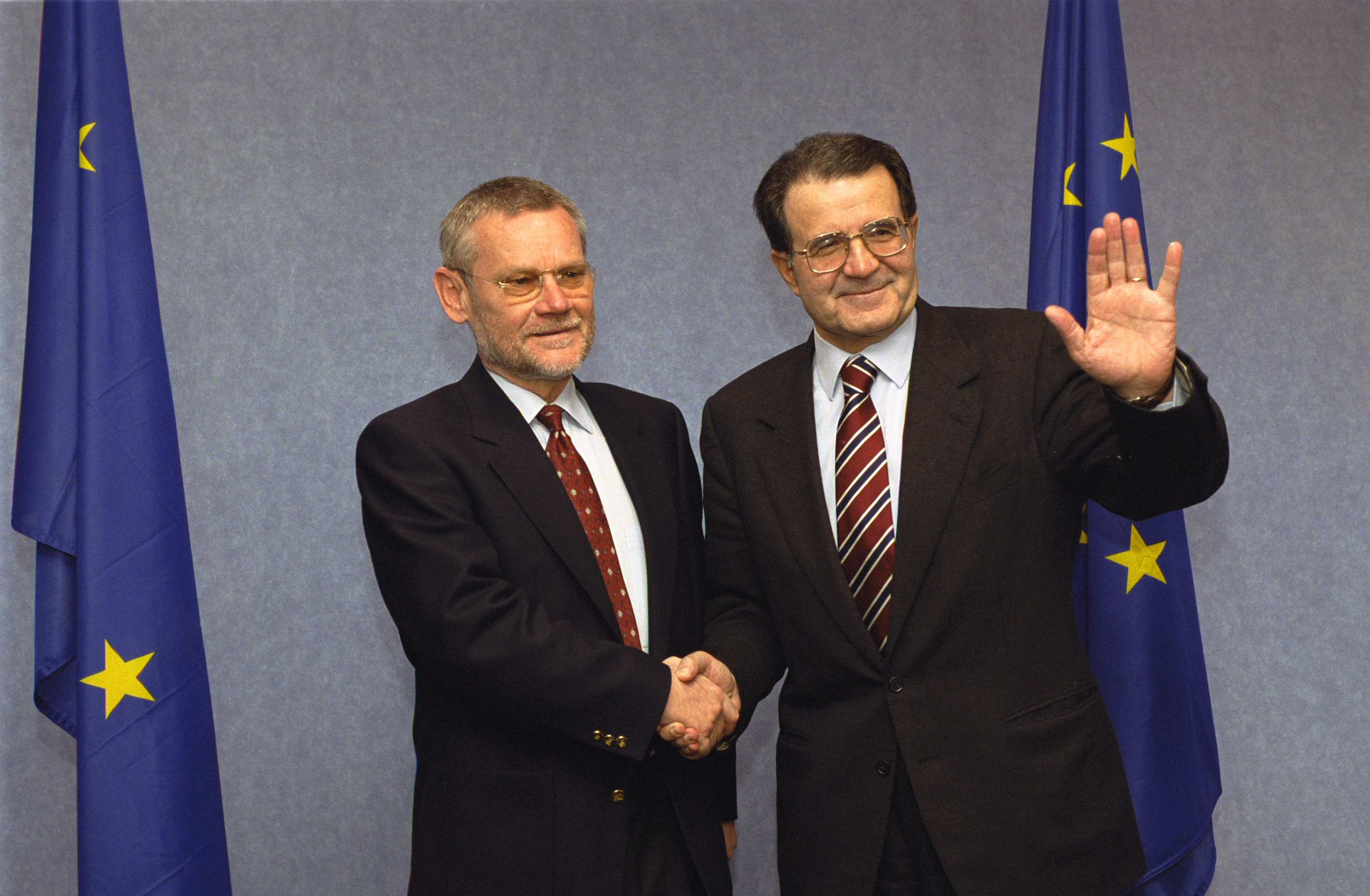
Račan alongside President of the European Commission Romano Prodi, 14 February 2000

Račan, like the newly elected president Stjepan Mesić, was initially hailed as a new, reformist leader who would symbolize the break with Croatia's authoritarian and nationalist past. While a democrat, Račan was, however, inefficient in running a government comprising six parties, the first coalition in modern Croatian history. His style of governance, sometimes described by the phrase "Odlučno možda" ("Decisively maybe" in English), plagued his government with factional struggles. Račan had to adopt a compromise-making attitude which limited the government's ability to commit fully to what should be done.

Račan faced problems when his main coalition partner Budiša lost in the 2000 Croatian presidential election. This made Budiša lose any significant role in the government so he became frustrated and started making trouble. This led to the break-up with Budiša who took a more nationalist approach to dealing with the issues of ICTY indictments against Croatian Army generals. This rift began to affect Račan's government on other issues. IDS was the first to leave the coalition in June 2001.

Račan formally resigned on 5 July 2002, after their coalition partner HSLS obstructed the ratification of a vital agreement with Slovenia on the status of the co-owned Krško Nuclear Power Plant. This led to a party split which saw the main faction of HSLS leave the ruling coalition and a dissenting faction which formed a new party called LIBRA which opted to stay in the government. This enabled Račan to form a slightly modified government that would remain in power until the next elections in 2003.

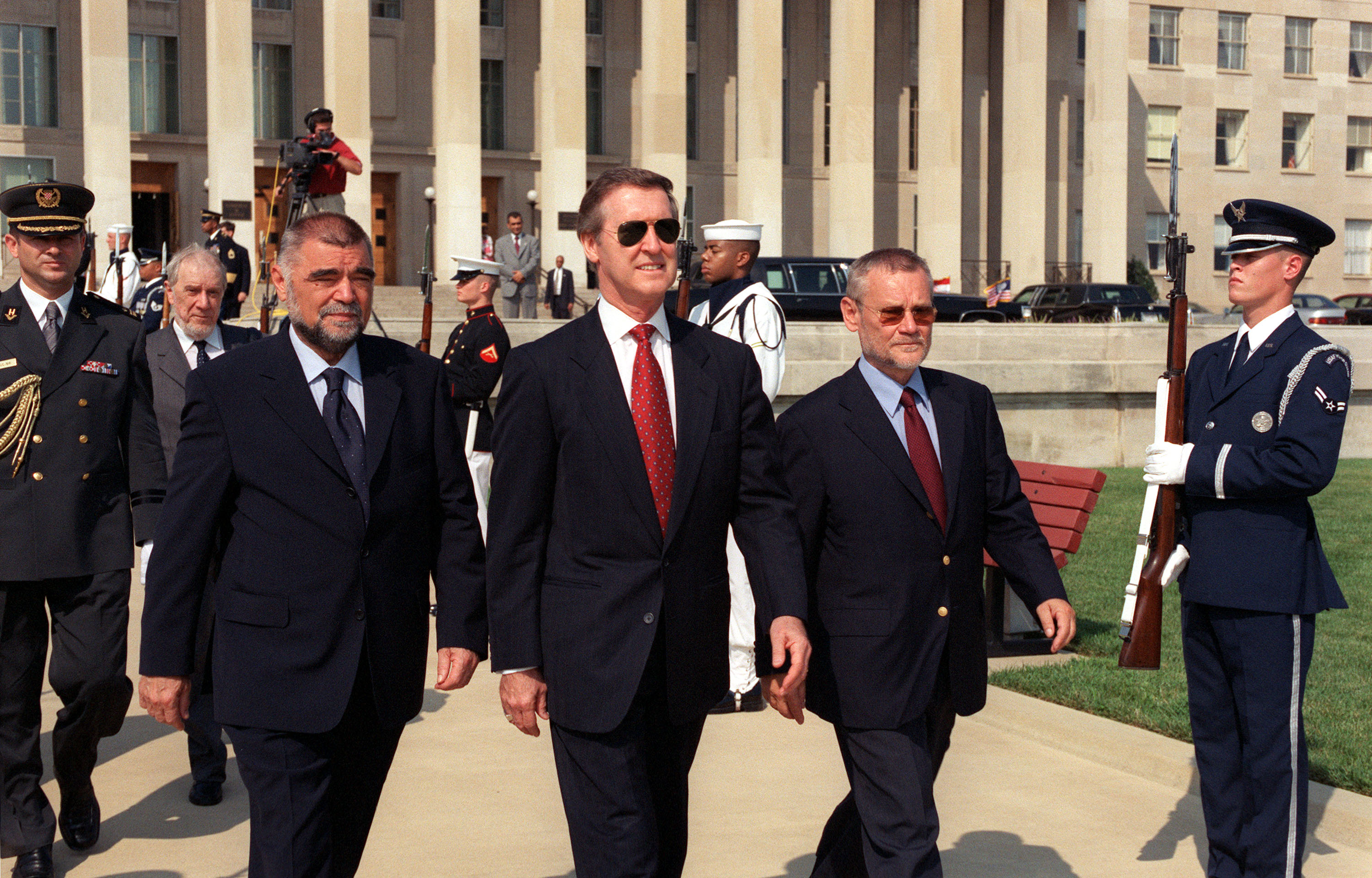
Croatian President Stjepan Mesić (left), U.S. Secretary of Defense William Cohen and Račan at the Pentagon, 8 August 2000

Račan's best achievements were in foreign policy. He successfully brought Croatia out of the semi-isolation of the Tuđman era and set the country on the road towards membership of the European Union. During his term as prime minister, the Constitution of Croatia was amended, turning Croatia from a semi-presidential system to a parliamentary democracy and granting more power to the parliament and prime minister. Among other things, Račan opened up the government's workings to the public with an "open-doors day" at the government and scheduled regular press conferences, which was in sharp contrast to previous governments who for the most part shunned media attention. Račan visited Bleiburg, Austria, in 2002 and attended the annual commemoration of the Bleiburg repatriations.

During his term in office, Croatia also changed economically. The opening to the West brought fresh inflows of capital which helped jump-start Croatia's GDP growth, amounting to around 5% per year during the years of the Račan government – high compared to previous years. The government also undertook a series of reforms in the public and government sectors and started large building projects, such as an affordable housing program and the construction of the A1 highway connecting the two biggest cities Zagreb and Split, which had been long-desired due to its importance for tourism. During this period, Račan also began to heal the rifts between Croatia and its neighbour Serbia and other former Yugoslav republics.

He also endured much criticism during that time when it came to the ICTY investigations. On the right-wing political spectrum he was attacked as being non-patriotic and a traitor to the national interests while on the liberal-left spectrum he was accused of not doing enough in fighting right-wing extremism and doing little on ensuring de-Tudjmanisation. In February 2001, he faced a massive public uproar when the indictment from ICTY came for Mirko Norac, who at the time was a runaway. The incident came to a peak when 100,000 people came to protest on the Split Riva against the government and a fear of a Coup d'état was at stake. The incident was calmed down when Račan made a deal with Carla Del Ponte which assured that Norac would be prosecuted in Croatia.

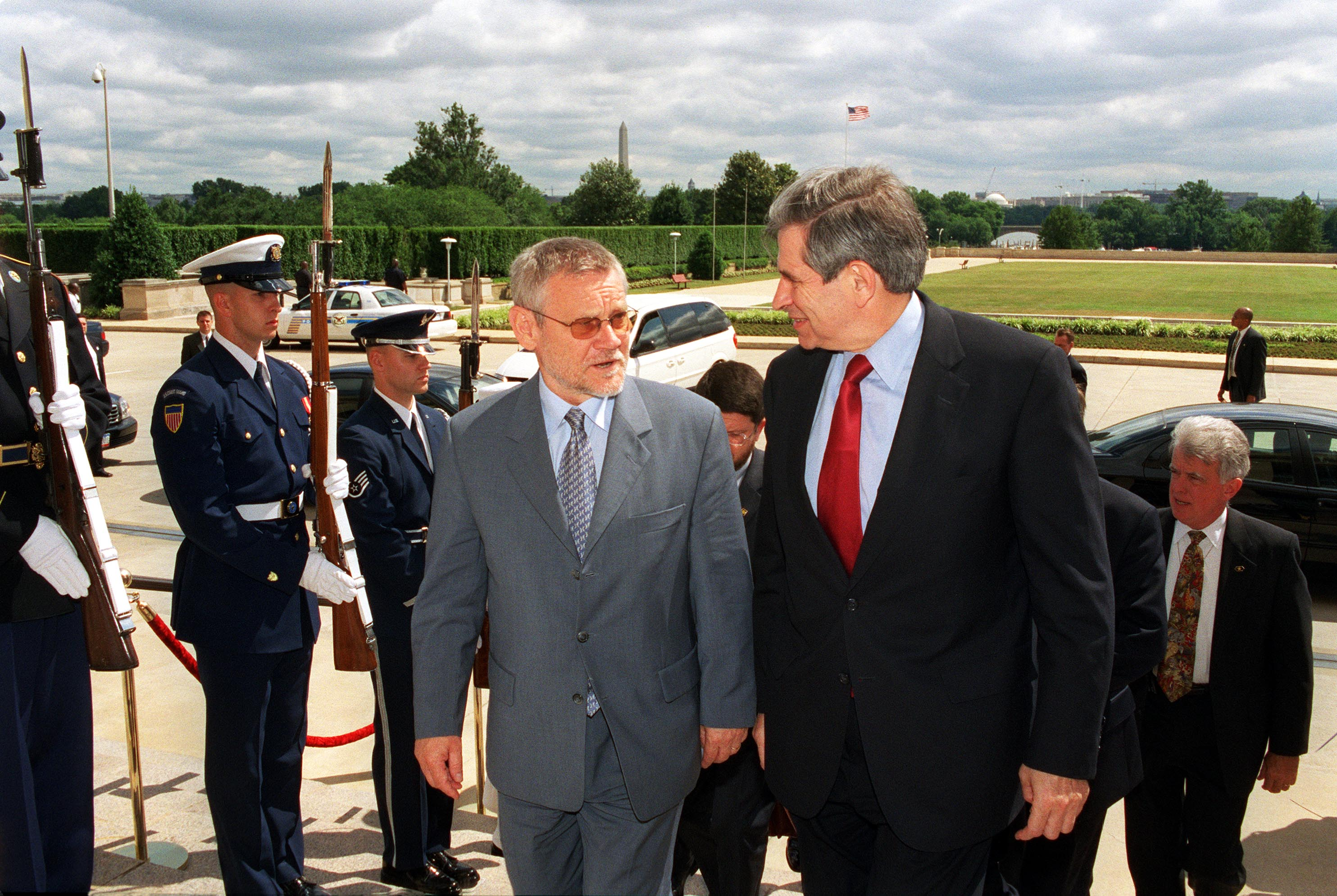
Račan with U.S. Deputy Secretary of Defense Paul Wolfowitz, 7 June 2002

In July 2001, came the indictment for Ante Gotovina but Račan delayed accepting it because he felt that some parts of the indictment were wrongly written and negative about the Croatian War of Independence. Since Gotovina was not arrested or even under surveillance during that time, he made his escape to exile which lasted until his arrest in 2005. It was a heavy blow in the Croatian negotiations process with the EU. The last major ICTY scandal happened in September 2002 when the indictment for Janko Bobetko came. Bobetko at the time was in a bad health condition, so he refused to leave his home and surrounded himself with armed people. Račan was afraid that if Bobetko died during the transport to The Hague, it would cause a national riot with the right-wing population. Račan rejected the indictment and Croatia faced a risk of international isolation at that point. Račan persuaded Bobetko to leave his house and go to the hospital. The situation was tense until April 2003 when Bobetko died. After his death, the indictment was dropped and Croatia continued with the negotiations.

Račan was also criticized for his ratification agreement with Slovenia over the Gulf of Piran in 2001. Račan attempted to improve relations with Slovenia which were needed for the EU negotiations so he made an agreement which gave Slovenia 80% of the gulf territory and an exit in international waters but Croatia would still have the border with Italy. The agreement was heavily attacked by the public and the parliament speaker at the time, Zlatko Tomčić, claims that he did not know how much territory was given to Slovenia until the new gulf map came out in the newspaper Slobodna Dalmacija. The agreement was later rejected and not signed by the prime minister so it never came to a realization.

=== Back in opposition (2003–2006) ===
Račan's centre-left coalition lost its majority in parliament following the November 2003 election. SDP did not create a big coalition like in the previous elections which cost them the votes. HSS decided to go alone and join the party which won the elections. Those tactics proved to be devastating for them. The coalition with HNS was rejected by Račan for reasons unknown which also proved to be a mistake. Račan conceded the defeat soon after election results were announced. His former coalition partners attacked him for conceding victory so early because they thought that they could try to enforce another great coalition but Račan said that it was unlikely to happen and even if it would happen, there would be no stability in such a great gathering. He officially ceased to be prime minister on 23 December 2003 when the Croatian Parliament approved his successor, Ivo Sanader of the HDZ, to take up that post.

SDP remained the most popular opposition party in opinion polls, and Ivica Račan was viewed as the leader of Croatian opposition. While viewed as indecisive as prime minister, he proved to be very skilful in maintaining SDP party leadership for over fifteen years. In 2006, Račan publicly stated that he had no intention of running for a new term as party president.

== Illness and death ==
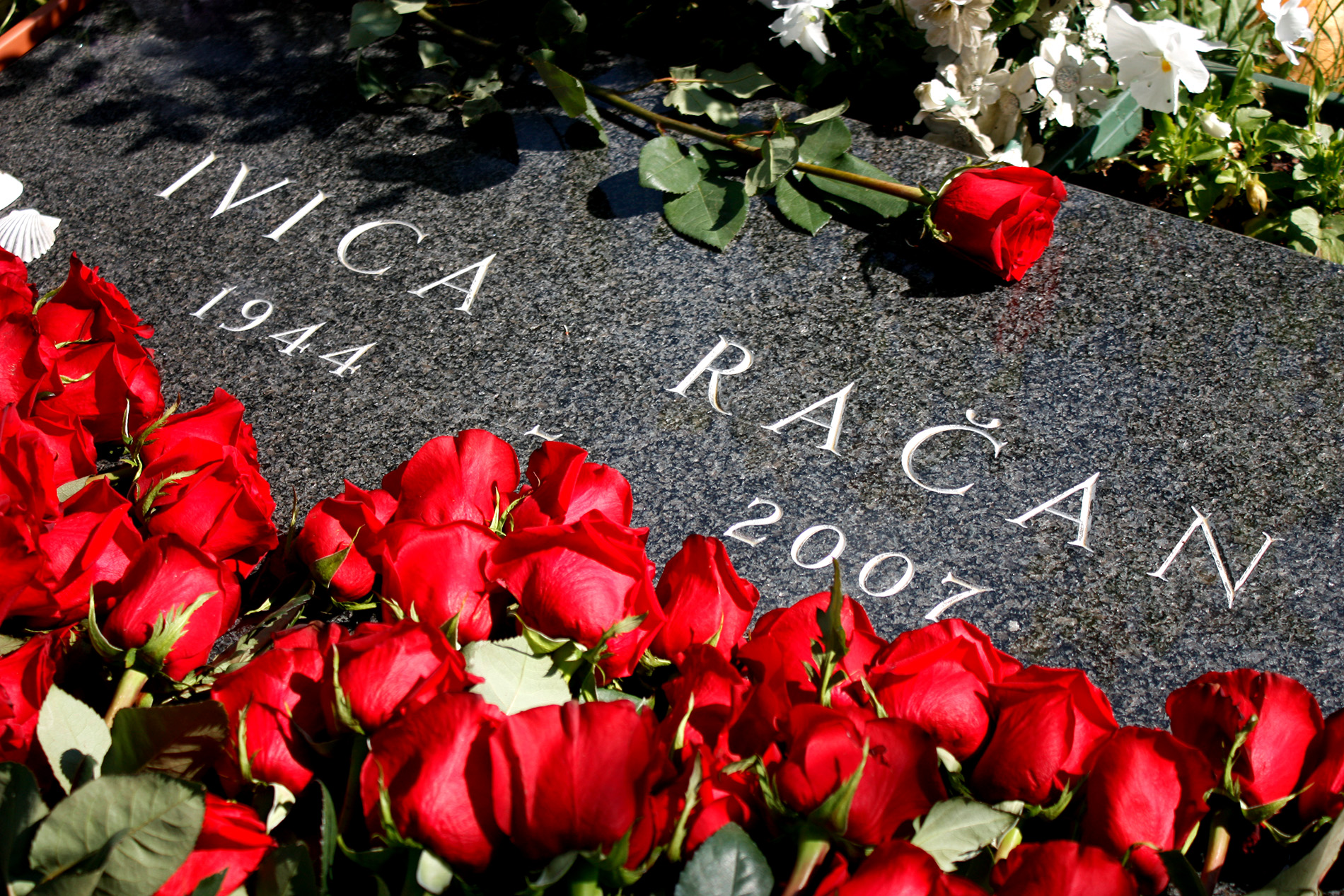
Račan's grave at Mirogoj Cemetery, Zagreb

On 31 January 2007, Račan announced that he would temporarily leave public life for health reasons. SDP vice-president Željka Antunović took over as chairperson of the party. His health began to deteriorate and was diagnosed with cancer in his shoulder. In February, Račan underwent two surgeries to remove cancer from his kidney, urinary tract, and shoulder. On 4 April it was announced that tests showed metastases in his brain. On 11 April he stepped down as leader of SDP. Translation of his resignation follows:

Colleagues, friends, comrades! Faced with a difficult illness I continue my fight for life but it is time to thank you for our joint work and your support in my political career. We were building together a Social democratic party and I am proud of what we have achieved. I am proud of the social democratic values – morals, work, honesty, tolerance – that we have forever engraved into the political life of our country. I have done as much as I knew and all that I could. With this, I resign from the party presidency and you will have to continue without me. Find a new strength at the election convention for I am sure that it exists in SDP.

On the morning of 12 April 2007, his condition was described as "critical" due to complications which occurred after he had a couple of surgical procedures to remove the cancer in his right shoulder. That same day, Zagreb radio station Radio 101 wrongly reported his death based on "unofficial information from two sources within the party", but SDP officials denied this. After that, he was reported to be in a critical condition, unable to communicate and under heavy sedation.

On 29 April 2007 at 3:05 am, Ivica Račan died at the Clinical Hospital Centre Zagreb. The reported cause of death was kidney cancer that had spread to his brain. He was buried on 2 May, at the Mirogoj Cemetery crematory. Per his request, only twelve closest friends and members of the family (including wife and both sons) were present. A separate commemoration was organized by SDP at the Lisinski Concert Hall, which was attended by the president, prime minister, a host of other dignitaries and many party members.

Throughout the three months of Račan's illness, the Croatian media regularly reported on his status due to the huge public interest. Račan himself made no public appearances after the day he announced his illness, but the media was regularly informed through SDP's spokespeople. This was a situation previously unknown in Croatia, particularly in comparison to the death of the late President Tuđman, when the details of his illness had been well guarded.

When Račan resigned as the party leader, he made no indication as to his preference for his successor but instead requested that an election convention be held, where the new leader would be elected by the party membership. Because of the upcoming November 2007 election, this was widely speculated to be relevant for party's poll results.

== Personal life ==
Račan married three times and had two sons, Ivan and Zoran, from his first marriage. His first wife Agata Špišić was a judge with the Croatian Constitutional Court. His second wife Jelena Nenadić was a librarian in the Kumrovec political school during the 1980s, and his third wife Dijana Pleština was a professor of political science at the College of Wooster in Ohio. He was a self-declared agnostic.

== Bibliography ==
- East, Roger; Thomas, Richard J. (2003). Profiles of People in Power: The World's Government Leaders (1st ed.). London, UK: Europa Publications. ISBN 978-1-85743-126-1.
- Stallaerts, Robert (2010). Historical Dictionary of Croatia (3rd ed.). Lanham, MD: Scarecrow Press. ISBN 978-0-8108-6750-5.

Political offices
Preceded by Zlatko Mateša	Prime Minister of Croatia; 2000–2003	Succeeded by Ivo Sanader
Party political offices
Preceded by Stanko Stojčević	President of the Presidency of the Central Committee of the League of Communists of Croatia; 1989–1990	Succeeded by Office abolished
Preceded by Office established	President of the Social Democratic Party; 1990–2007	Succeeded by Željka Antunović (acting)
