= Young Democrats for Europe =

Young Democrats for Europe (YDE)
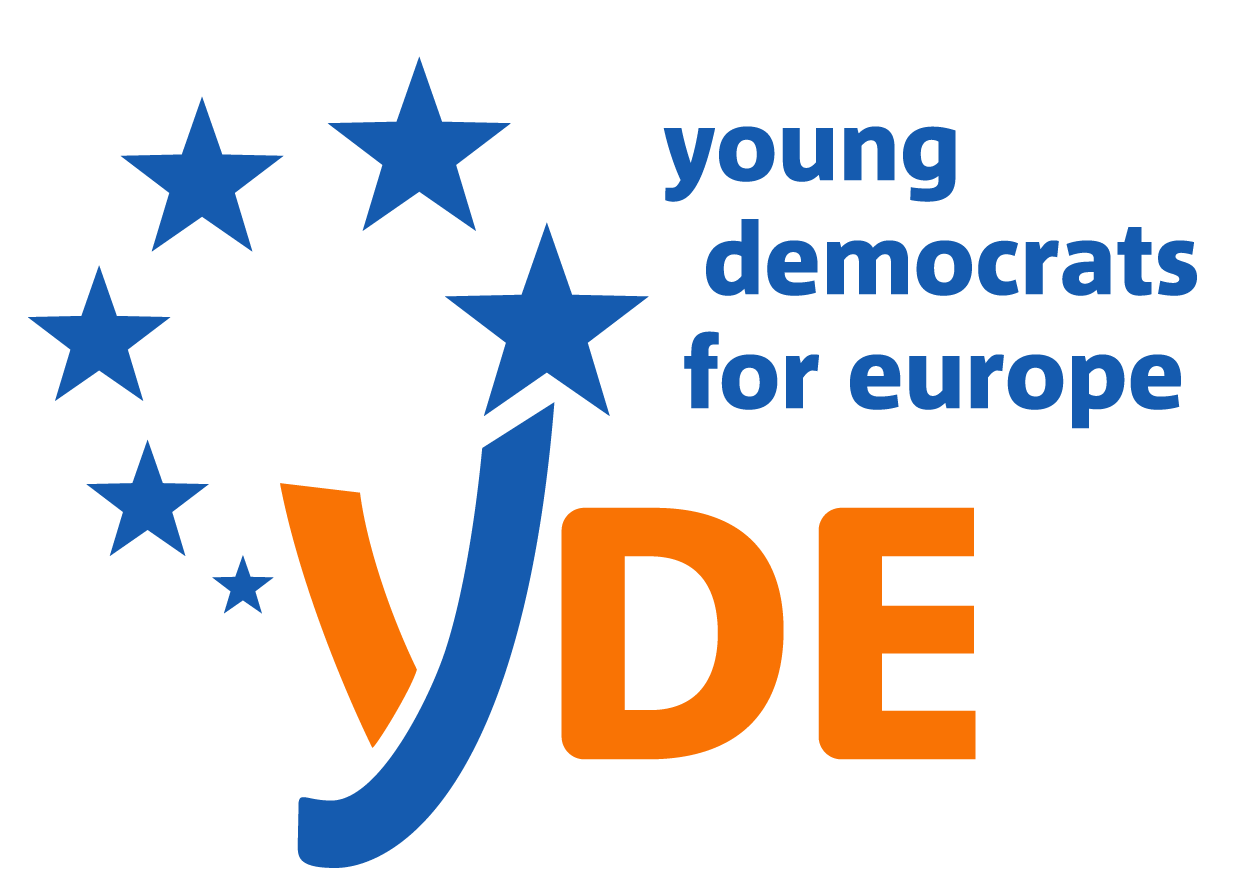
- Formation: 2007
- Type: Centrism; Pro-Europeanism
- Headquarters: Rue de l'Industrie 4; 1000 Brussels, Belgium
- President: Asier Areitio
- Secretary General: Alice Bernard-Montini
- Treasurer: Sergio Medina Hernandez
- Spokesperson: Sergio Soares
- Parent organisation: European Democratic Party (since 2019)
- Affiliations: Alliance of Democrats
- Website: youngdemocrats.eu

The Young Democrats for Europe (officially (in French) Jeunes Démocrates Européens) is the youth wing of the European Democratic Party. The seat of the organisation is Brussels.

== History ==
It was announced on 9 May 2007, the 50th Anniversary of the Treaty of Rome, and formally established at its first Conference on 22 September 2007 in Vilnius, Lithuania. The founding members are the youth wings of the seven EDP founding parties:

- Youth of the Daisy - Democracy is Freedom – The Daisy (Italy)
- Young Democrats - Democratic Movement (France)
- Alternativa Giovanile - Popular Alliance (San Marino)
- Europaiko Komma (Cyprus)
- Jaunimo organizacija DARBAS (Lithuania)
- Cesta Změny (Czech Republic)
- (Spain) Euzko Gaztedi (Basque Country)

== Members ==
=== Full members ===
Country	Youth organisation	Mother Party	Member
Croatia	Youth of NS Reformisti	People's Party - Reformists	since 2014
France	Jeunes Démocrates	Democratic Movement	founding member
Germany	Junge Freie Wähler	Free Voters	since 2017
Germany	Jung.Politisch.Gutaussehend.	Party of Progress	since 2026
Greece	Νεολαία Ένωσης Κεντρώων	Union of Centrists	since 2016
Italy	Youth of Italia Viva	Italia Viva	since 2021
Poland	Młodzi Liberałowie (previously Związek Młodzieży Demokratycznej)	Alliance of Democrats	since 2011
San Marino	Generazione Futura (previously Alternativa Giovanile)	Future Republic (since 2017); Popular Alliance (until 2017)	founding member
Slovakia	Mladi Europania	European Democratic Party	since 2011
Spain / Basque Country	Euzko Gaztedi Indarra	Basque Nationalist Party (EAJ-PNV)	founding member
Spain / Canary Islands	Jóvenes Nacionalistas	Canarian Coalition	since 2017
Romania	PRO Romania Tineret	PRO Romania Social Liberal	since 2020

=== Observing members ===
Country	Youth organisation	Mother Party	Member
Latvia	LRA Jaunatnes nodaļa	Latvian Association of Regions	since 2017

=== Former members ===
Croatia

- Youth of National Forum (NF)

Cyprus

- Neolaia Europaikou Kommatos - NEK (founding member) - 2007–2016
- Συμμαχία Νέων (Citizens' Alliance) - 2016–2021

Czech Republic

- Cesta Změny (founding member)

France

- UDI Jeunes (Union of Democrats and Independents, UDI) - 2014–2016

Italy

- API Giovani (Alliance for Italy, API)
- Giovani della Margherita (Democracy is Freedom – The Daisy, founding member)

Lithuania

- Jaunimo organizacija DARBAS (founding member) - 2007–2014

Slovakia

- Demokraticke Forum Mladeze (Democratic Slovakia Party) - 2011–2015
