= Opinion polling for the 2016 Croatian parliamentary election =

Opinion polling for the 2016 Croatian parliamentary election started immediately after the 2015 general election. Monthly party ratings were conducted by Ipsos Puls and Promocija Plus.

== Exit polls ==
Date	Polling Organisation/Client	People's Coalition	HDZ Coalition	Most	Živi zid	IDS	BM 365 NS-R	HDSSB HKS	Pametno Za grad
11 September 2016	Ipsos puls	57	57	12	7	3	2	1	1

== Coalition standings ==
Poll results are listed in the table below in reverse chronological order, showing the most recent first, and using the date of publication, as opposed to the date the survey's fieldwork was done, which can be seen in the second table. The highest percentage figure in each polling survey is displayed in bold, and the background shaded in the leading party's color. In the instance that there is a tie, then no figure is shaded. The lead column on the right shows the percentage-point difference between the two parties with the highest figures. When a specific poll does not show a data figure for a party, the party's cell corresponding to that poll is shown empty. The client can be seen in the second table.

Date	Polling Firm	People's Coalition	HDZ	Most	Živi zid	MB 365 NS-R	ORaH, HL, NH-PS	IDS	Others	Undecided	Lead
11 Sep	General Election Results	**33.2**	**36.3**	**9.9**	**6.2**	**4.0**	-	**2.3**	**11.0**	-	**3.1**
7 Sep	CRO Demoskop	**34.5**	27.2	8.8	6.0	3.1	1.7	1.6	5.6	11.5	7.3
4 Aug	CRO Demoskop	**34.4**	26.4	10.4	6.4	2.1	1.7	1.4	5.7	11.5	8.0
25 July: HDZ announced it would participate in the elections without national coalition
Date	Polling Firm	People's Coalition	Patriotic Coalition	Most	Živi zid	MB 365	ORaH	IDS	Others	Undecided	Lead
25 Jul	Ipsos Puls	**34.2**	29.6	11.4	6.8	4.1	0.6	1.7	5.6	6.0	4.6
5 Jul	CRO Demoskop	**36.1**	25.3	9.8	5.3	2.0	0.7	1.2	7.1	12.5	10.8
28 Jun	Ipsos Puls	**32.2**	23.1	12.1	7.7	2.3	-	1.4	10.1	11.1	9.1
22 May - 9 Jun	Promocija plus	**33.6**	26.9	7.1	8.2	2.6	0.9	1.6	7.0	12.1	6.7
4 Jun	CRO Demoskop	**34.7**	28.5	6.4	7.4	2.1	0.6	1.0	6.3	12.8	6.2
25 May	Ipsos Puls	**31.6**	31.2	7.9	7.8	4.3	-	1.4	6.7	7.6	0.4
6 May	CRO Demoskop	33.6	**34.7**	5.7	7.3	1.6	0.8	1.1	3.7	11.5	1.1
23 Apr	Ipsos Puls	32.1	**33.3**	6.9	6.8	4.6	1.0	1.6	6.6	7.2	1.2
5 Apr	CRO Demoskop	31.4	**31.9**	6.0	5.7	2.0	1.1	1.5	4.9	15.7	0.5
26 Mar	Ipsos Puls	31.5	**34.9**	7.6	6.3	3.7	1.1	1.6	5.9	7.3	3.4
5 Mar	CRO Demoskop	30.9	**31.4**	8.9	4.4	2.3	1.6	1.8	5.6	13.1	0.5
25 Feb	Ipsos Puls	28.9	**33.2**	10.2	6.0	2.8	1.5	2.0	6.8	8.6	4.3
5 Feb	CRO Demoskop	32.3	**32.7**	9.1	3.2	1.4	1.6	1.6	6.0	11.9	0.4
25 Jan	Ipsos Puls	29.1	**32.5**	14.5	4.0	4.2	-	2.0	7.1	6.7	3.4
8 Jan	CRO Demoskop	**32.1**	31.2	11.7	3.2	2.0	1.4	1.2	5.1	12.1	0.9
**2016**
23 Dec	Ipsos Puls	29.2	**33.8**	15.5	4.4	3.5	1.0	1.7	5.3	5.7	4.6
4 Dec	CRO Demoskop	**30.3**	29.4	15.4	3.3	2.3	1.8	1.8	4.9	10.7	0.9
25 Nov	Ipsos Puls	**30.2**	29.6	19.1	3.8	2.3	1.2	1.7	6.1	6.0	0.6
**8 Nov**	**General Election**	**33.3**	**33.3**	**13.5**	**4.2**	**3.3**	**1.7**	**1.8**	**8.9**	-	**Tie**

== Individual party standings ==
Date(s) conducted	Polling organization/client	Sample size	SDP	HDZ	Most	Živi zid	MB 365	HNS	HSS	ORaH	IDS	Others	Undecided	Lead
1-3 Aug	Promocija Plus/CRO Demoskop	1.300	29.6	26.0	10.5	5.9	1.7	2.9	2.1	0.9	1.1	7.7	11.6	3.6
1-18 Jul	Ipsos Puls/Dnevnik Nova TV	974	29.2	28.3	11.4	6.8	4.1	1.3	2.7	0.6	1.2	8.4	6	0.9
1-3 Jul	Promocija Plus/CRO Demoskop	1300	31.8	22.7	9.8	5.3	2.0	3.1	2.8	0.7	1.2	8.1	12.5	9.1
25-28 Jun	Ipsos Puls/Dnevnik Nova TV	1219	30.9	21.5	12.1	7.7	2.3	1.3	1.5	-	1.4	10.2	11.1	9.4
1-3 Jun	Promocija Plus/CRO Demoskop	1300	30.5	26.3	6.4	7.4	2.1	3.1	2.8	0.6	1.0	6.3	12.8	4.2
1–21 May	Ipsos Puls/Dnevnik Nova TV	976	29.1	28.7	7.9	7.8	4.3	1.5	1.4	-	1.4	10.4	7.5	0.4
2–5 May	Promocija Plus/CRO Demoskop	1300	29.2	29.5	5.7	7.3	1.6	3.1	2.8	0.8	1.1	7.4	11.5	0.3
1-21 Apr	Ipsos Puls/Dnevnik Nova TV	964	28.6	29.0	6.9	6.8	4.6	1.8	1.4	1.0	1.6	11.1	7.2	1.2
1-4 Apr	Promocija Plus/CRO Demoskop	1300	29.0	29.8	6.3	5.7	1.4	2.3	2.7	1.3	1.2	7.5	12.8	0.8
1-21 Mar	Ipsos Puls/Dnevnik Nova TV	969	28.0	30.2	7.6	6.3	3.7	1.9	1.7	1.1	1.6	10.6	7.3	2.2
1-3 Mar	Promocija Plus/CRO Demoskop	1300	28.2	29.3	8.6	4.0	1.4	2.3	1.8	1.0	1.3	8.3	13.8	1.1
1-21 Feb	Ipsos Puls/Dnevnik Nova TV	973	26.2	28.9	10.2	6.0	2.8	1.5	1.7	1.5	2.0	10.6	8.6	2.7
1-3 Feb	Promocija Plus/CRO Demoskop	1300	28.8	30.0	10.0	3.1	1.4	2.4	1.4	1.3	1.3	6.8	13.5	1.2
1-21 Jan	Ipsos Puls/Dnevnik Nova TV	975	26.6	28.5	14.5	4.0	4.2	1.5	1.9	-	2.0	16.8	6.7	1.9
4-6 Jan	Promocija Plus/CRO Demoskop	1300	29.6	29.3	12.6	3.0	2.0	2.2	1.8	1.6	1.2	6.6	10.1	0.3
2016
1-21 Dec	Ipsos Puls/Dnevnik Nova TV	976	27.2	29.5	15.5	4.4	3.5	1.0	1.7	1.0	1.7	8.8	5.7	2.3
30 Nov-2 Dec	Promocija Plus/CRO Demoskop	1300	28.2	27.6	15.6	3.2	2.4	2.6	2.1	1.0	1.5	5.6	9.2	0.6
8-20 Nov	Ipsos Puls/Dnevnik Nova TV	966	29.0	28.2	19.1	3.8	2.3	1.2	1.4	1.2	1.7	6.1	6.0	0.8

== Seats projections ==
Date	Polling Firm	SDP HNS HSU HSS	HDZ HSLS HDS Hrast	Most	Živi zid et al.	BM 365 NS-R et al.	IDS PGS RI	HDSSB HKS	Pametno Za grad
11 Sep	General Election	54	61	13	8	2	3	1	0
8 Sep	2x1 komunikacije	59	55	13	6	2	3	2	0
7 Sep	Ipsos Puls	55	53	12	8	7	3	1	1
4 Sep	Promocija Plus	62	55	12	3	3	3	2	0
2 Sep	Hendal	61	56	13	6	0	3	1	0
9 Jun	Promocija Plus	62	48	12	11	3	2	2	0
8 Nov 2015	General Election	56	59	19	1	2	3	2	-

== Polls of electoral districts ==
=== Coalition standings ===
The poll in the table below was conducted by Hendal for HRT from 16 to 26 August 2016:

District	SDP HNS HSU HSS	HDZ HSLS HDS Hrast	Most	Živi zid et al.	BM 365 NS-R et al.	IDS PGS RI	HDSSB HKS	Pametno Za grad	HL	NLSP ORaH et al.	Undecided	Lead
I. district	34.7	22.8	9.6	5.2	3.0	–	–	3.0	–	–	16.5	11.9
II. district	31.3	24.7	8.0	4.3	4.1	–	–	–	–	–	22.1	6.6
III. district	44.1	16.0	6.5	4.5	3.2	–	–	–	0.8	–	21.7	28.1
IV. district	24.2	33.0	7.1	3.9	–	–	5.4	–	–	–	20.4	8.8
V. district	22.4	36.8	4.7	3.7	2.9	–	3.7	–	–	–	22.1	14.4
VI. district	27.2	27.4	4.7	7.8	3.9	–	–	–	–	–	24.3	0.2
VII. district	32.2	26.8	8.3	4.6	2.4	–	–	2.3	–	–	19.2	5.4
VIII. district	32.0	9.6	4.7	6.4	–	14.8	–	–	–	–	22.6	22.4
IX. district	19.4	41.0	7.8	4.3	1.0	–	–	–	–	0.6	21.3	21.6
X. district	21.3	31.7	16.1	2.7	2.3	–	–	–	–	–	21.3	10.4

The poll in the table below was conducted by Promocija plus for RTL and Jutarnji List in August and September 2016:

(*) It is commonly assumed on the basis of results from previous elections and past experience that HDZ will win a majority (if not all) of the 3 seats allocated to the XI electoral district made up of Croatian citizens living abroad. Should this be the case HDZ would have a total of 58 seats, with 56 being considered safe seats and raising its possible seat range to 56-63.

(**) The 11 remaining seats are allocated in the XI (3) and XII (8) electoral districts. The XI electoral districts encompasses all Croatian citizens living abroad. The XII electoral district encompasses members of 22 recognized national minorities who elected representatives in a single district with the votes being subsequently allocated to candidates running for every minority's individual seat. The Serb minority elects 3 members, while 1 seat each is allocated to the Italian, Hungarian, Czech/Slovak, Albanian/Bosniak/Macedonian/Montenegrin/Slovene and Austrian/Bulgarian/German/Jewish/Polish/Roma/Romanian/Rusyn/Russian/Turkish /Ukrainian/Vlach minorities.

District	SDP HNS HSU HSS	HDZ HSLS HDS Hrast	Most	Živi zid et al.	IDS PGS RI	BM 365 NS-R et al.	NLSP ORaH et al.	HSP AS HKDU et al.	HDSSB HKS	Pametno Za grad	HSP HČSP et al.	HL	ID	Others	Undecided	Lead
I. district	38.7	23	9.7	5.7	–	3.7	0.5	1.8	–	2.7	0.8	0.5	–	1.8	10.9	15.7
II. district	33.6	28.7	7.2	4.8	–	6.8	0.9	1.1	–	1.3	0.9	0.7	–	2.2	11.6	4.9
III. district	44.2	20.8	6.3	4.6	–	5.0	0.6	2.4	–	0.7	0.2	1.1	–	1.3	12.9	23.4
IV. district	29.1	31.7	6.5	4.1	–	1.6	–	1.6	10.5	0.7	1.1	0.7	–	1.0	11.4	2.6
V. district	27.2	39.5	7.0	3.9	–	1.9	0.5	1.1	3.7	0.7	0.5	–	–	1.1	12.8	12.3
VI. district	34.2	28.8	6.3	4.5	–	5.9	0.5	2.0	–	0.9	1.8	0.5	–	1.8	12.8	5.4
VII. district	34.4	28.9	6.8	6.2	1.3	4.4	–	0.9	–	0.9	1.1	0.5	–	1.8	12.8	5.5
VIII. district	35.4	16.4	5.4	4.8	16.8	1.0	1.2	1.0	–	1.4	1.0	–	1.2	1.4	13.2	19
IX. district	24.2	43.3	6.8	3.9	–	1.3	3.4	0.7	–	0.9	0.9	0.4	–	2.0	12.3	19.1
X. district	26.2	36.6	14.7	1.9	–	0.9	0.7	1.0	–	3.1	0.9	0.5	–	1.2	12.2	10.4
Total seats	62	55*	12	3	3	3	0	0	2	0	0	0	0	0	11**	7
Safe seats	57	53*	11	2	3	3	0	0	1	0	0	0	0	0	-	4
Marginal seats (gain)	3	5	1	6	0	1	0	0	0	0	0	0	0	0	-	
Marginal seats (loss)	5	2	1	1	0	0	0	0	1	0	0	0	0	0	-	
Seat range	57-65	53-60	11-13	2-9	3	3-4	0	0	1-3	0	0	0	0	0	-	

=== Individual party standings ===
The poll in the table below was conducted by Promocija plus for RTL in May and June 2016:

District	Date(s) conducted	Polling Firm	SDP	HDZ	Most	Živi zid	MB 365	HNS	HSS	HSLS	IDS	HDSSB	Others	Undecided	Lead
I.	Unspecified (published 9 Jun)	Promocija plus/RTL and Jutarnji List	35.9	20.3	8.7	7.2	-	1.9	-	1.6	-	-	10.5	14.1	15.6
II.	Unspecified (published 8 Jun)	Promocija plus/RTL and Jutarnji List	28.8	21.1	6.6	8.0	4.4	2.6	4.8	1.0	-	-	6.4	16.1	7.7
III.	Unspecified (published 24 May)	Promocija plus/RTL and Jutarnji List	32.5	17.2	5.1	8.0	-	9.9	-	-	-	-	-	12.0	15.3
IV.	Unspecified (published 22 May)	Promocija plus/RTL and Jutarnji List	27.7	30.4	5.6	9.3	-	3.9	1.6	1.0	-	9.7	2.9	-	2.7
V.	Unspecified (published 26 May)	Promocija plus/RTL and Jutarnji List	24.6	33.5	4.9	5.6	-	-	-	-	-	5.1	-	11.0	8.9
VI.	Unspecified (published 7 Jun)	Promocija plus/RTL and Jutarnji List	31.1	24.1	7.4	9.2	4.9	2.0	-	-	-	-	9.9	11.5	7.0
VII.	Unspecified (published 6 Jun)	Promocija plus/RTL and Jutarnji List	31.5	24.5	6.1	12.3	-	1.6	-	-	-	-	15.2	8.9	7.0
VIII.	Unspecified (published 29 May)	Promocija plus/RTL and Jutarnji List	33.6	12.9	5.0	7.7	-	-	-	-	16.3	-	9.4	15.4	17.3
IX.	Unspecified (published 31 May)	Promocija plus/RTL and Jutarnji List	25.2	36.5	6.3	7.4	-	-	-	-	-	-	12.0	12.6	11.3
X.	Unspecified (published 2 Jun)	Promocija plus/RTL and Jutarnji List	22.5	28.3	15.8	7.9	-	-	-	-	-	-	14.7	10.8	5.8
