= Gabrić =

Gabrić is a Croatian surname. Notable people with the surname include:

- Drago Gabrić (born 1986), Croatian football midfielder
- Gabre Gabric (1914/1917–2015), Croatian-born Italian track and field athlete
- Nikica Gabrić (born 1961), Croatian physician and politician
- Tonči Gabrić (born 1961), former Croatian football player
