= Dolac (Primošten) =

Dolac is a small place in Croatia located between Primošten and Bilo. The main economic activity is tourism.
