= Paola Concia =

Italian politician (born 1963)

Anna Paola Concia
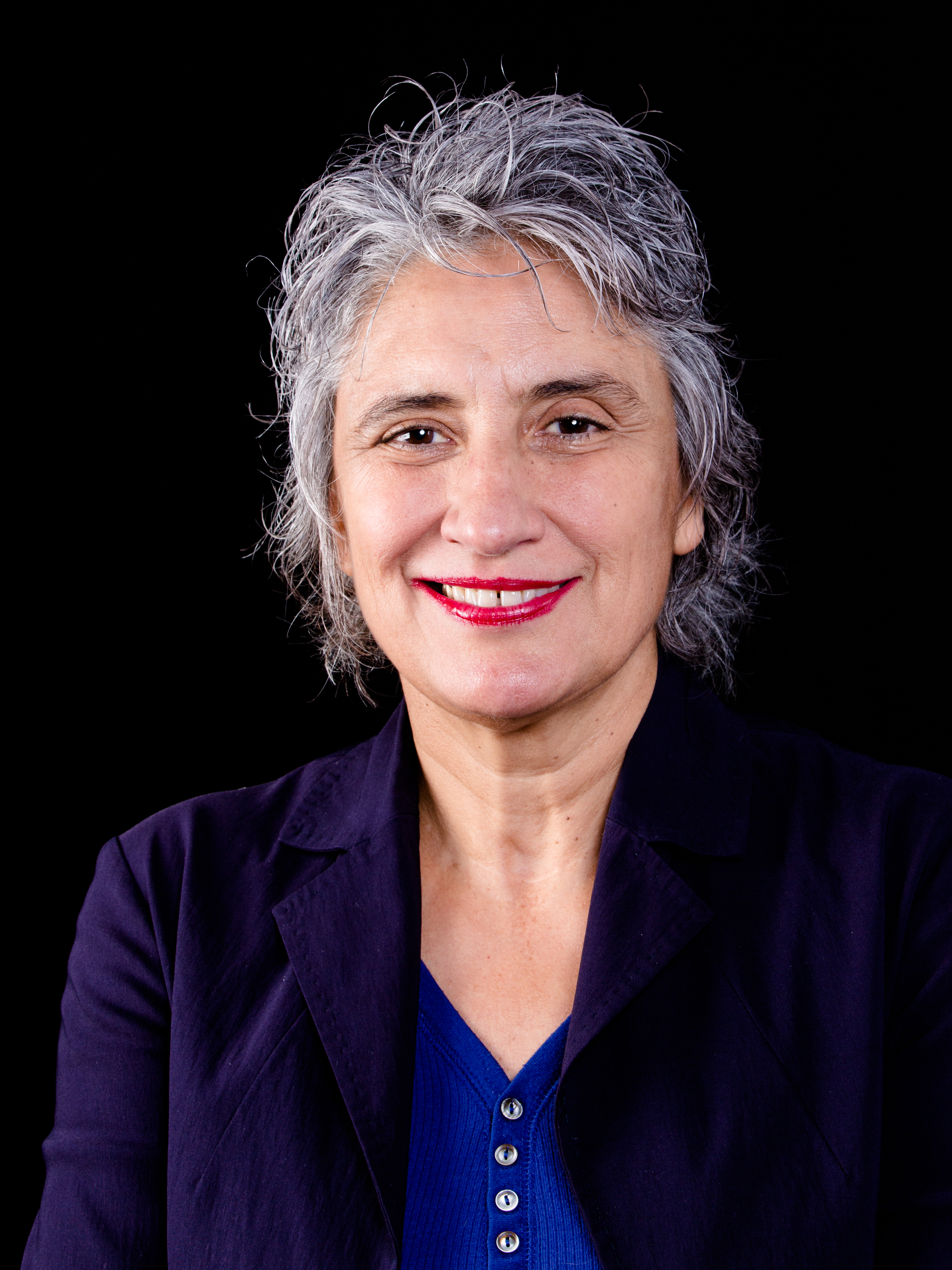

Member of the Chamber of Deputies
- In office 14 April 2008 – 14 March 2013

Personal details
- Born: 4 July 1963 (age 63) Avezzano, Italy
- Party: Public Space (2026–present)
- Other political affiliations: PCI (until 1991); PDS (1991–1998); DS (1998–2007); PD (2007–2025)
- Spouse: Ricarda Trautmann (m. 2011)
- Education: University of L'Aquila
- Profession: Sport manager

Anna Paola Concia (born 4 July 1963) is an Italian politician and LGBT rights activist.

== Biography ==
Concia was born in Avezzano, Province of L'Aquila, and she graduated in sports science from L'Aquila's Istituto Superiore di Educazione Fisica; following her graduation, she has worked as a physical education and tennis instructor. She first became involved with politics while at ISEF, and she was initially a member of the Italian Communist Party.

Concia moved to Rome in 1992 following the death of her mother and the collapse of her marriage. She worked as a parliamentary assistant before working as an adviser to Anna Finocchiaro, the minister responsible for equal opportunities. Concia later advised Giovanna Melandri after her promotion to Minister of Cultural Heritage and Activities in 1998. Following the 2001 general election, Concia left politics to pursue her work in tennis. She came out a year later.

Concia was named as the Democratic Party's spokesperson on homosexuality, and she used her position within the party to become a prominent activist for equal rights. She was first elected to the Chamber of Deputies in the 2008 general election.

In August 2011, she married her wife, Ricarda Trautmann, in Frankfurt.

After leaving the Democratic Party in 2025, in June 2026 she joined the Public Space movement founded by Pina Picierno, Vice-President of the European Parliament.
