= Rijeka City Council =

Legislative body of Rijeka, Croatia

City Council of the City of Rijeka Gradsko vijeće Grada Rijeke

Type
- Type: Unicameral

Leadership
- President: Robert Kurelić (AM)
- Deputy President: Tanja Savić (Ind.)

Structure
- Seats: 31
- Political groups: AM–Unija–Centre–HSU–Focus–Alternativa (11) (Note: AM (2); CENTAR (2); UNIJA (2); HSU (2); ALTERNATIVA 101 (2); FOKUS (1)); HDZ (5); PGS–IDS–RI (4) (Note: PGS (2); IDS (1); RI (1)); SDP (3); We Can! (3); Most (1); Independents (4)

Elections
- Voting system: Party-list proportional representation D'hondt method See Elections in Croatia
- Last election: 18 May 2025
- Next election: 2029

Website
- www.rijeka.hr

The City Council of the City of Rijeka is the legislative body of the city of Rijeka, Croatia. It is the local self-government representative body of the citizens of the city of Rijeka, in accordance with the Constitution, law and the Statute of the City of Rijeka.

The city council has 31 members who are elected by universal suffrage and secret ballot for a term of four years. National minorities also has right to elect two more members, one Serb and one Italian.

The city council has its president and two vice presidents elected by a majority of the vote of all councilors of the city council elected from among its membership. One vice president is elected by the opposition.

City council sessions are public.
