= European Conference of Ventotene for Freedom and Democracy =

- Inaugurated: 2025
- Founder: Pina Picierno

The European Conference of Ventotene for Freedom and Democracy is an annual event held in Ventotene, Italy. The conference was founded by Pina Picierno, vice president of the European Parliament, and organized by the European Parliament Liaison Office in Italy.

== History ==
=== 2026 ===
The Second European Conference of Ventotene for Freedom and Democracy was held from 10 to 12 September 2026. Taiwan's Vice President Hsiao Bi-khim attended the conference as a guest of honor, along with Minister of Foreign Affairs Lin Chia-lung. In a Facebook post, Picierno wrote that Hsiao's attendance in the conference "was kept secret until her arrival to protect her participation", adding "No one can determine who can be hosted on European soil, what voices can be heard, and what presences must be hidden."
