= Lista za Rijeku – Lista per Fiume =

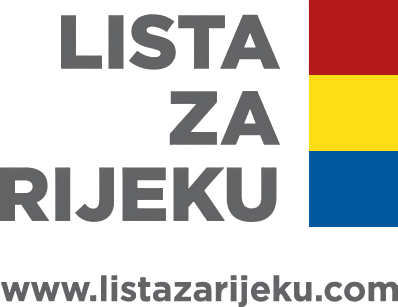
- Leader: Zdravko Ivankovič
- Founded: 2006
- Headquarters: Rijeka
- Youth wing: Young Autonomists (MA)
- Ideology: Social liberalism Progressivism; Regionalism; Localism
- Political position: Centre-left
- European affiliation: European Free Alliance (2010–2023)
- Sabor: 0 / 151
- European Parliament: 0 / 12
- Rijeka City Council: 1 / 31

Website
- www.listazarijeku.com

The Lista za Rijeku – Lista per Fiume (lit. 'List for Rijeka' in Croatian and Italian) is a regional political party with strong local-patriotic, autonomous and progressive-liberal tendencies, based in the city of Rijeka, Croatia (known as Fiume in Italian). Founded in 2006, the party is active primarily within the confines of the city of Rijeka and the boroughs surrounding it (the so-called Rijeka ring). Its main aim is to achieve increased authority and development for the regional and local government through the retention of 70% of the locally collected taxes, which currently go to the central government in Zagreb.

The current party president is Zdravko Ivankovič, and its governing body is a nine-member presidency council.

The party had two members in the Rijeka city council (receiving 6% of the vote in the local elections of 2013) and 8 elected councilors in city district councils. After the 2025 Croatian local elections, the party has one seat in the Rijeka City Council, consisting of its former party leader Danko Švorinić.

From 2010 until 2023, Lista za Rijeku – Lista per Fiume was a full member of the European Free Alliance.

== Election results ==
=== Legislative ===
Election	Coalition	Votes	%	Seats	+/–	Government
Election	Coalition	Coalition		RI		Government
2011	AM-SUH-ASH	12,545	0.53%	0 / 151	New	Extra-parliamentary
2015	IDS-PGS	42,193	1.83%	0 / 151	0	Extra-parliamentary
2016	IDS-PGS	43,180	2.27%	0 / 151	0	Extra-parliamentary
2020	D-HL	6,594	0.40%	0 / 151	0	Extra-parliamentary
2024	Did not contest			0 / 151	0	Extra-parliamentary

=== European Parliament ===
Election	List leader	Coalition	Votes	%	Seats	+/–	EP Group
Election	List leader	Coalition	Coalition		RI		EP Group
2014	Nikica Gabrić	HSLS-PGS-NF	22,098	2.40 (#6)	0 / 11	New	–
2019	Did not contest				0 / 12	0	–
2024	Valter Flego	Fair Play List 9 (Note: Including also IDS, NPS, SDSS, HSLS, HNS, NS-R, SD, D and PGS.)	41,710	5.54 (#5)	0 / 12	0	–
