= Youth Action (Croatia) =

Youth Action Akcija mladih
- Abbreviation: AM
- President: Vjekoslav Rubeša
- Secretary-General: Bojan Kurelić
- Founded: 22 February 2005
- Headquarters: Ciottina 19, Rijeka
- Membership: c. 2,800
- Ideology: Populism; Youth politics
- Political position: Centre
- Colours: Orange
- Slogan: "Neither Left Nor Right But Forward"
- Sabor: 0 / 151
- European Parliament: 0 / 12
- County Prefects: 0 / 21
- Mayors: 0 / 128

Website
- akcijamladih.org

Youth Action (Croatian: Akcija mladih or AM) is a populist and anti-establishment political party in Croatia founded in 2005 in Lovran. The party has chapters across the country, but has been the most active and successful in the city of Rijeka, Primorje-Gorski Kotar County and Zadar County. In addition to fighting for greater youth rights and local issues, the party advocates for anti-corruption, green and progressive policies. Youth Action regularly criticizes the two-party duopoly of HDZ and SDP in the country.

In 2009, Youth Action merged with the Croatian Youth Party (Croatian: Hrvatska stranka mladih, HSM).

At the 2013 local elections, party won 19 seats in the county and city councils in Istria, Primorje-Gorski Kotar and Zadar counties.

== Electoral history ==
=== Legislative ===
Election	In coalition with	Votes won (coalition totals)	Percentage	Seats won	Change
2007	None	5,096	0.21%	0 / 151	Steady
2011	RI-SUH (8th electoral district)	12,337	0.52%	0 / 151	Steady
2015	ŽZ (9th electoral district)	13,440	0.60%	0 / 151	Steady
2016	ŽZ-PH-ABECEDA-HDSS-MS	117,208	6.23%	0 / 151	Steady
2020	ŽZ-SIP-NLSP-PH-HSS SR-HSSČKŠ-ZSZ	37,628	2.26%	0 / 151	Steady

=== European Parliament ===
Election	In coalition with	Votes won (coalition totals)	Percentage	Seats won	Change
2013	None	11,068	1.49%	0 / 12	Steady
2014	None	7,807	0.85%	0 / 11	Steady
2019	endorsed Mislav Kolakušić	84,765	7.89%	0 / 11	Steady
