= 2016 Croatian parliamentary election =

- 11 September 2016
- All 151 seats in the Croatian Parliament; 76 seats needed for a majority
- Opinion polls
- Turnout: 54.62% (▼8.44pp)
Party	Leader	Vote %	Seats	+/–
HDZ-led coalition	Andrej Plenković	36.58	61	+2
People's Coalition	Zoran Milanović	33.45	54	−2
Most	Božo Petrov	9.84	13	−6
Only Option	Ivan Vilibor Sinčić	6.17	8	+7
For Prime Minister	Milan Bandić	4.05	2	0
IDS–PGS–Rl	Boris Miletić	2.27	3	0
HDSSB–HKS	Dragan Vulin	1.24	1	−1
Independents	Željko Glasnović	0.31	1	+1
Minority lists
SDSS	Vojislav Stanimirović	83.55	3	0
Kali Sara	Veljko Kajtazi	53.16	1	0
DZMH	Róbert Jankovics	53.02	1	+1
UARH	Ermina Lekaj Prljaskaj	25.31	1	+1
Independents	—	–	2	−1
This lists parties that won seats. See the complete results below.
Result by constituency
Prime Minister before	Prime Minister after
Tihomir Orešković; Independent	Andrej Plenković; HDZ

Parliamentary elections were held in Croatia on 11 September 2016, with all 151 seats in the Croatian Parliament up for election. The elections were preceded by a successful motion of no confidence against Prime Minister Tihomir Orešković and his cabinet on 16 June 2016, with 125 MPs voting in favour of the proposal. A subsequent attempt by the Patriotic Coalition to form a new parliamentary majority, with Minister of Finance Zdravko Marić as Prime Minister, failed and the Parliament voted to dissolve itself on 20 June 2016. The dissolution took effect on 15 July 2016, which made it possible for President Kolinda Grabar-Kitarović to officially call for elections on 11 September 2016. These were the ninth parliamentary elections since the 1990 multi-party elections.

The elections were contested by the two largest parties in the outgoing eighth Parliament; the Croatian Democratic Union (HDZ), led by Andrej Plenković, and the Social Democratic Party (SDP) led by Zoran Milanović. The SDP contested the election as part of the People's Coalition, consisting of the SDP, HNS, HSS and HSU. They were also challenged by a number of other parties and coalitions, including the Bridge of Independent Lists (Most), which held the balance of power after the 2015 elections. The incumbent Prime Minister Tihomir Orešković, a non-partisan technocrat, announced that he would not be running on any party's candidate list and would not seek reelection.

The election resulted in a victory of HDZ with 61 seats in the parliament, while the People's Coalition won 54 seats. Andrej Plenković started talks about forming a governing majority with Most, which won 13 seats. Zoran Milanović announced his withdrawal from politics after the defeat. A few weeks after the election HDZ and Most concluded talks on forming a government, which would also include the 8 Members of Parliament representing national minorities. On 10 October 2016 Plenković formally presented 91 signatures of support by MPs to President Kolinda Grabar-Kitarović, therefore far more than the necessary majority of 76 signatures and he was thus made Prime Minister-designate with a 30-day mandate to form a government until 9 November 2016. The 9th Assembly of the Croatian Parliament was constituted on 14 October with the election of Most leader Božo Petrov as Speaker. On 19 October a parliamentary vote of 91 in favor, 45 against and 3 abstentions formally confirmed Croatia's 14th government cabinet since the first multi-party elections in 1990, with Andrej Plenković as Croatia's 12th Prime Minister. The new cabinet consisted of 20 ministers, including Goran Marić, a minister without portfolio who was on later tasked with leading the newly formed Ministry of State Property.

== Background ==
Following the 2015 elections a government was formed by independent businessman Tihomir Orešković who was supported by the conservative Patriotic Coalition, led by Croatian Democratic Union (HDZ), and Bridge of Independent Lists (MOST). However, HDZ put forward a motion of no confidence on 16 June, with 125 of 151 MPs voting in favor of the motion. The HDZ sought to form a new government with Minister of Finance Zdravko Marić as Prime Minister, however it was clear that he would not get support of 76 MPs. On 20 June MPs voted to dissolve parliament effective on 15 July, resulting in snap elections being called by President Kolinda Grabar-Kitarović, who called for elections on 11 September.

== Electoral system ==
The 151 members of the Croatian Parliament are elected by three methods; 140 are elected in ten 14-seat constituencies by open list proportional representation using a 5% electoral threshold, with seats allocated using the d'Hondt method; 3 are elected in a special constituency for Croatian citizens and people of Croatian descent living overseas; and 8 are elected from a constituency for ethnic national minority groups: 3 for Serbs, 1 for Italians, 1 for Hungarians, 1 for Czechs and Slovaks, 1 for Albanians, Bosniaks, Macedonians, Montenegrins and Slovenes, and 1 for Austrians, Bulgarians, Germans, Jews, Poles, Roma, Romanians, Rusyns, Russians, Turks, Ukrainians and Vlachs.

== Political parties ==
Name	Abbr.	Ideology	Political spectrum	Leader	Seats 2015	Seats before election
People's Coalition
Social Democratic Party of Croatia; Socijaldemokratska partija Hrvatske	SDP	Social democracy	Centre-left	Zoran Milanović	42	42
Croatian People's Party-Liberal Democrats; Hrvatska narodna stranka - liberalni demokrati	HNS	Liberalism	Centre	Ivan Vrdoljak	9	9
Croatian Party of Pensioners; Hrvatska stranka umirovljenika	HSU	Single-issue politics (pensioner's rights)	Centre	Silvano Hrelja	2	2
Croatian Peasant Party; Hrvatska seljačka stranka	HSS	Agrarianism	Centre	Krešo Beljak	2	1
HDZ "Coalition"
Croatian Democratic Union; Hrvatska demokratska zajednica	HDZ	National conservatism	Centre-right	Andrej Plenković	49	51
Croatian Social Liberal Party; Hrvatska socijalno liberalna stranka	HSLS	Conservative liberalism	Centre-right	Darinko Kosor	2	2
Croatian Christian Democratic Party; Hrvatska demokršćanska stranka	HDS	Christian democracy	Right-wing	Goran Dodig	1	1
Croatian Growth - Movement for a successful Croatia; Hrast - Pokret za uspješnu Hrvatsku	Hrast	Social conservatism, Political Catholicism	Right-wing	Ladislav Ilčić	1	1
For Prime Minister Coalition
Bandić Milan 365 - Labour and Solidarity Party; Bandić Milan 365 - stranka rada i solidarnosti	BM 365	Populism	Centre	Milan Bandić	2	2
People's Party - Reformists; Narodna stranka - Reformisti	Reformisti	Social liberalism	Centre	Radimir Čačić	1	1
New Wave - Party of Development; Novi val - Stranka razvoja	Novi val	Social democracy	Centre-left	Ljubo Jurčić	0	0
Croatian Peasant Party Stjepan Radić; Hrvatska seljačka stranka Stjepan Radić	HSS SR	Agrarianism	Centre	Jurica Šoić	0	0
Bloc Pensioners Together; Blok umirovljenici zajedno	BUZ	Single-issue politics (Pensioners' rights)	Centre	Milivoj Špika	1	1
The Only Option Coalition
Human Blockade; Živi zid	Živi zid	Populism, Anti-establishment, Euroscepticism	Centre	Ivan Vilibor Sinčić	1	1
Always Frankers; Uvijek Frankeri	UF	Populism			0	0
Change Croatia; Promijenimo Hrvatsku	PH	Populism	Centre	Ivan Lovrinović	0	3
Youth Action; Akcija mladih	AM	Liberalism	Centre	Vjekoslav Rubeša	0	0
Alphabet of democracy Abeceda demokracije	AD				0	0
Even Stronger Istria Coalition
Istrian Democratic Assembly; Istarski demokratski sabor	IDS	Regionalism (Istria), Social liberalism	Centre-left	Boris Miletić	3	3
Alliance of Primorje-Gorski Kotar; Primorsko goranski savez	PGS	Regionalism (Primorje-Gorski Kotar)	Centre	Darijo Vasilić	0	0
List for Rijeka; Lista za Rijeku	RI	Regionalism (Rijeka)	Centre	Danko Švorinić	0	0
Homeland Coalition
Croatian Party of Rights dr. Ante Starčević; Hrvatska stranka prava dr. Ante Starčević	HSP AS	National conservatism	Right-wing	Ivan Tepeš	3	3
Democratic Union of National Renewal – Right; Demokratski savez nacionalne obnove – Desno	Desno	National conservatism, Croatian nationalism	Far-right	Anto Đapić	0	0
Croatian Christian Democratic Union; Hrvatska kršćanska demokratska unija	HKDU	Christian democracy, National conservatism	Right	Marko Veselica	0	0
United Party of Rights; Ujedinjena stranka prava	USP	National conservatism	Right-wing	Antun Kljenko	0	0
Croatian Democratic Party; Hrvatska demokratska stranka	HDS	Christian democracy	Right wing		0	0
HDSSB Coalition
Croatian Democratic Alliance of Slavonia and Baranja; Hrvatski demokratski savez Slavonije i Baranje	HDSSB	Regionalism (Slavonia), Conservativism	Right-wing	Dragan Vulin	2	2
Croatian Conservative Party; Hrvatska konzervativna stranka	HKS	National conservatism, Economic liberalism	Right-wing	Ruža Tomašić	0	0
No Selling Coalition
Independent List Stipe Petrina; Nezavisna lista Stipe Petrina	NLSP			Stipe Petrina	0	1
Free Croatia; Slobodna Hrvatska	SH				0	0
Together Movement; Pokret Zajedno	PZ				0	0
Sustainable Development of Croatia; Održivi razvoj Hrvatske	ORaH	Sustainable development, Environmentalism, Progressivism	Centre-left	Luka Keller	0	0
Shift Coalition
Croatian Party of Rights; Hrvatska stranka prava	HSP	Croatian nationalism, National conservativism, Euroscepticism	Far right	Daniel Srb	0	0
Croatian Pure Party of Rights; Hrvatska čista stranka prava	HČSP	Croatian nationalism, National conservativism	Far right	Ivan Pandža	0	0
Action for Better Croatia; Akcija za bolju Hrvatsku	ABH	Croatian nationalism, National conservativism	Right-wing	Željko Cvrtila	0	0
Family Party; Obiteljska stranka	OS	Social conservatism, Political Catholicism	Right-wing	Mate Knezović	0	0
Turn Croatia Around Coalition
Smart; Pametno	Pametno	Social liberalism, Progressivism, Economic liberalism	Centre	Marijana Puljak	0	0
For the City; Za Grad	Za Grad	Social Democracy, Liberal socialism	Centre	Iva Kvakić; Ivan Zelenić	0	0
Not part of any coalition
Autochthonous Croatian Party of Rights; Autohtona – Hrvatska stranka prava	A-HSP	Croatian nationalism, Anti-communism, Radical nationalism, Euroscepticism	Far-right	Dražen Keleminec	0	0
Bridge of Independent Lists; Most nezavisnih lista	Most	Fiscal conservatism, Economic liberalism	Centre	Božo Petrov	19	12
Blocked - Deblock Croatia; Blokirani - Deblokirajmo Hrvatsku					0	0
Defenders' Patriotic Party of Croatia; Braniteljsko domoljubna stranka Hrvatske	BDSH				0	0
Croatian Defenders' People's Party; Hrvatska braniteljska pučka stranka	HPBS				0	0
Croatian Workers Party; Hrvatska radnička stranka	HRS	Left-wing populism, Labor rights	Left-wing	Mladen Novosel	0	0
Croatian Labourists - Labour Party; Hrvatski laburisti - stranka rada	Laburisti	Labor rights	Left-wing	Tomislav Končevski	3	2
Movement for Modern Croatia; Pokret za modernu Hrvatsku	PMH				0	0
Quite a small party Sasvim mala stranka	SMS				0	0
Socialist Labour Party of Croatia; Socijalistička radnička partija	SRP	Communism, Socialism	Far-left	Vladimir Kapularin	0	0
Croatian Party of Order; Hrvatska stranka reda	HSR				0	0
Međimurje Democratic Alliance; Međimurske demokratski savez	MDS				0	0
Independent List Željko Knapić; Neovisna lista Željko Knapić					0	0
Active Defenders' and Pensioners Party; Aktivni branitelji i umirovljenici Hrvatske	ABU Hrvatske				0	0
Croatian Aspect Party; Stranka hrvatski vidik	SHV				0	0
Women's Democratic Party; Demokratska stranka žena	DSŽ	Women's rights	Centre	Marija Maja Jelinčić	0	0
Independent List Dragutin Dukić; Neovisna lista Dragutin Dukić					0	0
Green Alliance; Zeleni savez	ZS				0	0
Development and Progress Party; Stranka razvoja i napretka	SRNA				0	0
Istrian democrats Istarski demokrati	ID-DI	Regionalism (Istria)	Centre-left	Damir Kajin	0	0
Croatian Party of Rights 1861; Hrvatska stranka prva 1861	HSP 1861	Anti-communism, Anti-globalism, Anti-tudjmanism, Croatian nationalism	Far-right	Dobroslav Paraga	0	0
Zagorje Party; Zagorska stranka	ZS	Regionalism (Hrvatsko Zagorje)	Centre	Miljenko Jerneić	0	0
Pensioners Party; Stranka umirovljenika	SU				0	0

== Election campaign ==
Campaigning for the early parliamentary elections officially began on 16 August 2016 and ended at stroke of midnight between 9 and 10 September 2016. An election silence officially commenced at that time and lasted until 19:00 local time on election day (11 September) when voting officially ended. All electoral activity, such as distributing or exhibiting promotional materials near polling stations or encouraging voters to vote for a certain political party, coalition or candidate is prohibited during the duration of the election silence and is punishable by law.

On 12 August a television debate hosted by Croatian Radio Television (HRT) featured SDP and People's Coalition chairman Zoran Milanović and HDZ chairman Andrej Plenković. According to a poll taken by daily newspaper Jutarnji List of 36.700 of its readers, 58% of those taking part answered that Milanović had been the more convincing of the two candidates and had won the debate, while 42% said the same of Plenković. However, some 87% of the 6.000 readers taking part also stated that the television debate had not greatly altered their political views. Readers were also asked to assign a grade (on a scale of 1 to 5) to each of the candidates, with 9.000 people taking part and giving Plenković an average grade of 3,36, while Milanović received an average grade of 3,23.

=== Issues ===
The main issues in the electoral campaign included fostering economic growth achieved after a six-year recession (2008-2015) and both major parties, the SDP (in government 2011–2016) and HDZ (in government from January 2016) claimed that economic recovery was begun during their period of government and that it was the result of their policies. Other issues included the halted education reform initiative, which was due to be tested in selected Croatian schools in late 2016 and the debate over ending political polarization caused by differing views on Croatia's role in the Second World War and the resurgence of extreme far-right ideologies in Croatian society. Numerous parties competing in the election called for an end to divisions caused by a continuing debate about the roles of the Ustaša and Communist regimes in Croatian history and questions relating to whether both regimes should be considered to have been authoritarian and to have committed certain war crimes on ethnic or ideological grounds.

Furthermore, an important issue of the campaign was how to regulate Croatia's relations with Serbia. Some of the most important aspects of this debate included the controversial criminal law adopted by Serbia, by which it unilaterally declares itself to have criminal jurisdiction over all war crimes committed on the territory of the former Yugoslavia. Under this law Serbia has issued a large number of arrest warrants for numerous Croatian veterans of the Croatian War of Independence, including numerous prominent political leaders and army commanders. Another issue which was also discussed was whether to use the blocking of Serbia's accession negotiations with the European Union to put pressure on the Serbian government to repeal the controversial law.

Less prominent issues in the campaign included the negative demographic trends in Croatia, mostly relating to a large number of Croatian citizens migrating to other countries to seek employment (among them many young highly educated citizens), diminishing birth rates, the depopulation of certain parts of the country due to poor economic and social conditions, as well as the growing median age of the population.

== Opinion polls ==
=== Exit polls ===
Date	Polling Organisation/Client	People's Coalition	HDZ Coalition	Most	Živi zid	IDS	BM 365 NS-R	HDSSB HKS	Pametno
11 September 2016	Ipsos puls	57	57	12	7	3	2	1	1

== Results ==
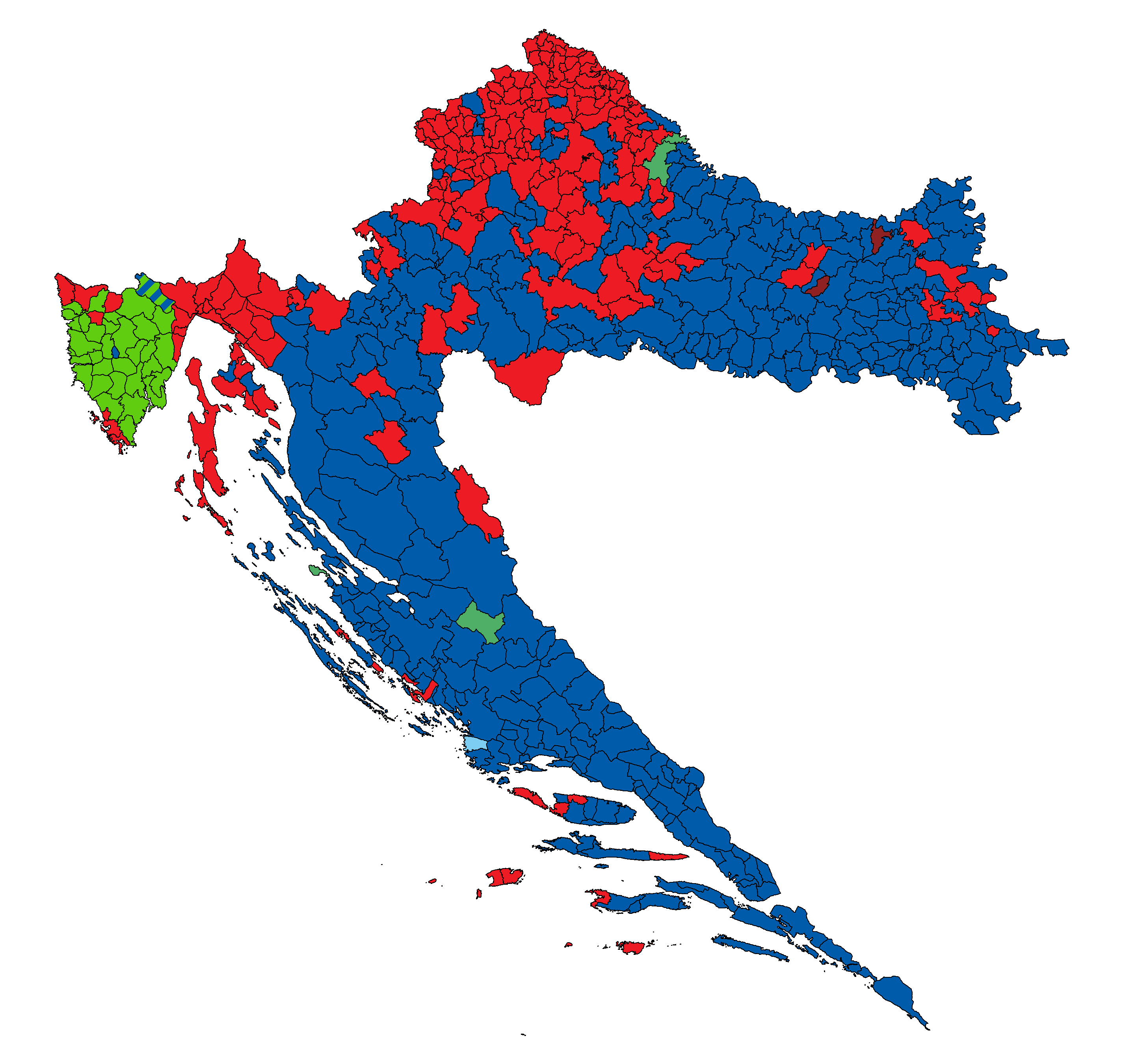
Results of the election based on the majority of votes in each municipality of Croatia HDZ Coalition People's Coalition Even Stronger Istria Coalition HDSSB Coalition For Prime Minister Coalition No Selling Coalition

Results by municipality, shaded according to winning party's percentage of the vote.: HDZ—>80% HDZ—70–80% HDZ—60–70% HDZ—50–60% HDZ—40–50% HDZ—<40% / SDP—>80% SDP—70–80% SDP—60–70% SDP—50–60% SDP—40–50% SDP—<40% / IDS—50–60% IDS—40–50% IDS—<40% BM365—50–60% BM365—40–50% BM365—<40% HDSSB—<40% NLSP—40–50%

The elections yielded a surprise victory for the conservative HDZ, though most opinion polls had predicted the People's coalition would have the largest share of seats in Parliament. The People's Coalition's unexpected defeat was, among other things, attributed to the release of a leaked audio recording of former Prime Minister and coalition chairman Zoran Milanović speaking at a private meeting with Croatian war veterans. In the recording Milanović used numerous derogatory terms, calling Serbs ʽʽpitifulˮ and stating that "Bosnia and Herzegovina is not a countryˮ and it is thought that these statements undermined support for the People's Coalition among minority voters. The HDZ, which had trailed the People's coalition in opinion polls for over two months prior to the election and was thought to be facing certain defeat, managed under its new leader, MEP Andrej Plenković to shed the image of being a corruption-engulfed right-wing party for a more Europe-oriented centrist one. Low turnout is also thought to have contributed to the unexpectedly large number of seats won by the HDZ, as their voters and supporters were expected to have a high turnout rate on election day. After the election Milanović announced that he would not stand for reelection as party chairman of the SDP in the upcoming leadership election. Following the conservatives' victory, the stock market reacted generally favourably to the election results.

It is considered likely that the next governing majority will be formed by a coalition of the HDZ and the centre-right Most party, which once again gained the role of kingmaker. However such a coalition would also need the support of additional parties to command a majority of seats, which is also a prerequisite for naming a Prime Minister-designate, who is given a 30-day mandate to form a government by the President. In the event of a HDZ-Most coalition government, Andrej Plenković as chairman of the HDZ is thought to be the most likely candidate to become the 12th Prime Minister of Croatia.

National minorities elected 8 representatives through a separate election system: Milorad Pupovac (84,55% of votes), Mile Horvat (63,68%) and Boris Milošević (60,04%) for the Serb national minority, Róbert Jankovics (53,02%) for the Hungarian minority, Furio Radin (72,65%) for the Italian minority, Vladimir Bilek (84,43%) for the Czech and Slovak minorities, Veljko Kajtazi (53,16%) for the Austrian, Bulgarian, German, Jewish, Polish, Roma, Romanian, Rusyn, Russian, Turkish, Ukrainian, Vlach minorities and Ermina Lekaj Prljaskaj (25.31%) for the Albanian, Bosniak, Macedonian, Montenegrin and Slovene minorities. Six of the eight representatives of national minorities from the 8th Assembly of Parliament were reelected, while Šandor Juhas (Hungarian minority) lost his bid for reelection and Mirko Rašković (Serb minority) did not run for another term.

Three Members of Parliament were elected by Croatian citizens living abroad in an overseas constituency. Traditionally, the HDZ is heavily favored to win all three seats, however in this election Željko Glasnović, who ran his own independent party list, won one seat in Parliament.

Party	Votes	%	Seats	+/–
HDZ Coalition (HDZ–HSLS–HDS–HRAST)	696,166	36.58	61	+2
People's Coalition (SDP–HNS–HSU–HSS)	636,602	33.45	54	–2
Bridge of Independent Lists	187,282	9.84	13	–6
Only Option Coalition (ŽZ–PH–AM–AD–HDSS)	117,336	6.17	8	+7
For Prime Minister (BM 365–NS–R–NV–HSS SR–BUZ)	76,990	4.05	2	0
Even Stronger Istria (IDS–PGS–LzR)	43,180	2.27	3	0
Turn Croatia Around (Pametno, Za Grad)	38,926	2.05	0	New
HDSSB Coalition (HDSSB–HKS)	23,573	1.24	1	–1
NLSP–SH–PZ–ORaH–SHZ–SU–ZS	22,427	1.18	0	0
Coalition Shift (HSP–HČSP–ABH–OS)	13,180	0.69	0	0
Homeland Coalition (HSP AS–Desno–HKDU–USP–HDS)	11,166	0.59	0	–3
Authentic Croatian Party of Rights	6,276	0.33	0	–
Croatian Labourists – Labour Party	4,821	0.25	0	–
Socialist Labour Party of Croatia	3,672	0.19	0	–
Let's Unblock Croatia	3,014	0.16	0	–
Women's Democratic Party	1,999	0.11	0	–
Istrian Democrats	1,708	0.09	0	–
Very Small Party	1,335	0.07	0	–
Croatia Defence People's Party	1,169	0.06	0	–
Veterans' Patriotic Party of Croatia	1,078	0.06	0	–
Green Party	1,069	0.06	0	–
Croatian Party of Rights 1861	888	0.05	0	–
Croatian Republican Party	798	0.04	0	–
Međimurje Democratic Alliance	675	0.04	0	–
Croatian Party of Order	626	0.03	0	–
Active Veterans and Pensioners of Croatia	439	0.02	0	–
Croatian Aspect Party	348	0.02	0	–
Party of Development and Progress	346	0.02	0	–
Movement for Modern Croatia	286	0.02	0	–
Independents	5,855	0.31	1	+1
Total	1,903,230	100.00	143	0
Valid votes	1,903,230	98.08		
Invalid/blank votes	37,166	1.92		
Total votes	1,940,396	100.00		
Registered voters/turnout	3,552,502	54.62		
Minority seats
Independent Democratic Serb Party			3	0
Democratic Union of Hungarians of Croatia			1	+1
Croatian Romani Union "Kali Sara"			1	0
Union of Albanians of Croatia			1	+1
Czech and Slovak minority			1	0
Italian minority			1	0
Total			8	0
Total votes	37,902	–		
Registered voters/turnout	211,267	17.94		
Source: State Election Committee

== Government formation ==
Following the announcement of election results late on 11 September 2016 it was thought that there could be a repeat of the long-lasting and somewhat tumultuous talks that followed the previous election. Namely, as yet again no party or coalition had gained an absolute majority of 76 seats, coalition talks would be required between the two larger parties (HDZ and the People's Coalition) and the numerous smaller parties to form such a majority. However, the opposition SDP-led People's Coalition conceded defeat after winning only 54 seats in Parliament. Its leader, former Prime Minister Zoran Milanović, ruled out running for reelection to his party's chairmanship, effectively also ruling out any possible attempts to form a governing majority, thus allowing the HDZ to begin talks with the Bridge of Independent Lists (Most), its junior partner in the outgoing government led by the non-partisan Prime Minister Tihomir Orešković. Most set out seven conditions for entering into a government with any party and Plenković began discussions lasting several weeks with Most representatives. Plenković also held talks with the 8 representatives of national minorities, as HDZ and Most would not have a majority without their support. Over the next few weeks several other parties, including the HSS proceeded to give their support to a government led by Plenković. However, it is widely viewed that HSS chairman Krešo Beljak agreed to give Plenković the support of his party's 5 MPs and "100 days of peace before turning into the sharpest opposition" in order to calm tensions resulting from a dispute between him and HSS MEP Marijana Petir, who had called for HSS to enter the center-right government to be formed by HDZ and Most instead of remaining a part of the People's Coalition as an opposition party. The dispute escalated and Beljak proceeded to suspend over 100 members of the party, including Petir. Plenković further received the support of the Milan Bandić 365 party, one out of two HSU MPs and one former member of Human Blockade. He formally received 91 signatures of support from MPs on 10 October 2016, far more than the necessary 76, and presented them to President Kolinda Grabar-Kitarović, who named him Prime Minister-designate and gave him 30 days time until 9 November to form a government. On 14 October Parliament constituted its 9th Assembly since 1990 by electing Most leader Božo Petrov as the 11th Speaker of Parliament. On 19 October Andrej Plenković was confirmed as the 12th Prime Minister of Croatia along with his cabinet of 20 ministers by a vote of 91 in favor, 45 against and 3 abstentions among 151 Members of Parliament. His government received the support of MPs belonging to the HDZ–HSLS–HDS coalition, Bridge of Independent Lists, Milan Bandić 365, HSS, HDSSB, SDSS and five representatives of other national minorities.

== See also ==
- Cabinet of Andrej Plenković
