= Sandro Gozi =

Italian politician, former Undersecretary of State for European Affairs (born 1968)

Sandro Gozi MEP
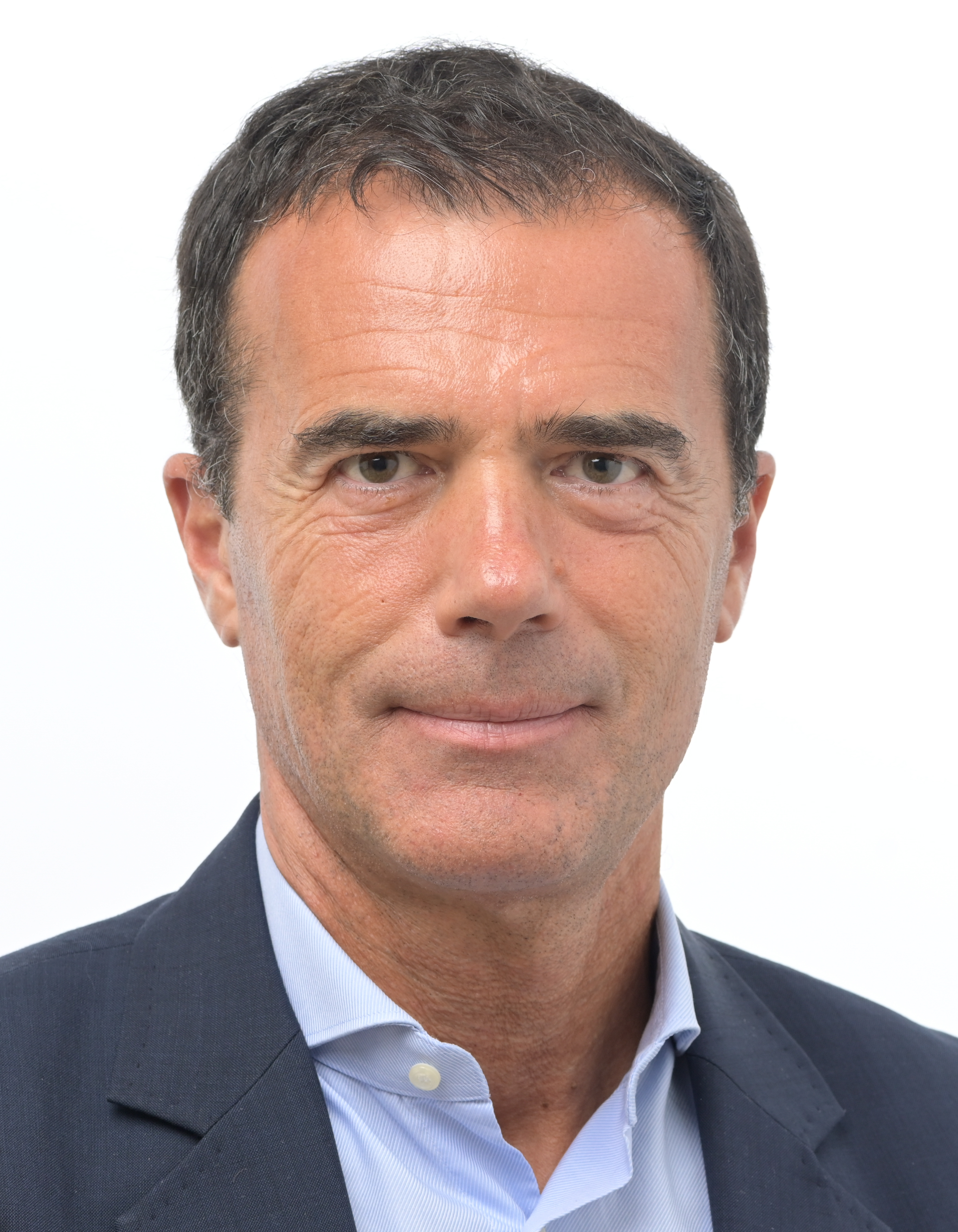

Member of the European Parliament
- Incumbent
- Assumed office 1 February 2020
- Constituency: France

Undersecretary to European Affairs
- In office 22 February 2014 – 1 June 2018
- Prime Minister: Matteo Renzi; Paolo Gentiloni
- Preceded by: Enzo Moavero Milanesi
- Succeeded by: Paolo Savona

Member of the Chamber of Deputies
- In office 28 April 2006 – 22 March 2018
- Constituency: Piedmont

Personal details
- Born: 25 March 1968 (age 58) Sogliano al Rubicone, Italy
- Party: Italy: MSI (1984–1992); PRI (1992–1994); Independent (1995–2007); PD (2007–2019); Italia Viva (since 2019); France: Democratic Movement
- Other political affiliations: EDP (since 2004); RI (since 2014); Renaissance (2019)
- Education: University of Bologna
- Profession: Teacher
- Website: Official website

Sandro Gozi (Sogliano al Rubicone, 25 March 1968) is an Italian politician, former Undersecretary of State for European Affairs in the Matteo Renzi and Paolo Gentiloni governments.

In France, he was advisor for European affairs in the government of Philippe II for a few months. Since 1 February 2020, he has been a member of the Renew Europe group in the European Parliament, elected in the French constituency on the Renaissance list promoted by French President Emmanuel Macron and En Marche.

He is President of the Brussels-based EU-India Association and The Spinelli Group. Since 5 May 2021 he has been Secretary General of the European Democratic Party.

He was the representative of the EDP in ‘Team Europe’, the team of three that led the European campaign "Renew Europe Now" in the 2024 European Parliament election.

== Early life and education ==
Gozi was born on 25 March 1968 in Sogliano al Rubicone. After attending high school in Cesena, he graduated in law from the University of Bologna in 1992. He then obtained a diplôme d'études approfondies at SciencesPo in Paris in 1994. In 1996, he defended a PhD in public law in Bologna with a thesis on European comitology. He also holds a master's degree in international politics from Brussels Free University in 1998.

During his university years, Gozi was close to the post-fascist Italian Social Movement (MSI) of Giorgio Almirante, with whom he is portrayed in a photo. In 1990, he was a member of the MSI's Forlì Youth Front, circumstance which he later denied. He said to have voted for the first time for the Italian Republican Party.

== Early career ==
Between 1995 and 1996, Gozi worked in Italy's foreign service, dealing with economic relations with the states of the former Yugoslavia, Turkey, Cyprus, Albania, and Greece. He subsequently was an official at the General Secretariat of the European Commission for almost a decade from 1996 to 2005, dealing with relations with the European Parliament, and then with the negotiation for the adoption of the euro. In 1997, he participated in the negotiations on the Amsterdam Treaty. From 2000 to 2004, he served as political assistant and member of cabinet of then European Commission President Romano Prodi, and then at the Bureau of European Policy Advisers (BEPA) at the start of the first Barroso Commission.

In 2001, Gozi was also appointed coordinator for the Stability Pact for South Eastern Europe. When he returned to Italy in 2005, he initially worked as diplomatic adviser to leftist Nichi Vendola, president of the Apulia region. In 2006, he joined Romano Prodi's electoral committee in view of the 2006 Italian general election and served as deputy secretary general of the European Democratic Party. Gozi has been visiting lecturer at various European universities, including the College of Europe in Bruges (in 2001), and the European College in Parma, as well as the Drew University of Madison, New Jersey. From 1999 to 2008, he was director of the ISMaPP institute in Brussels.

== Political career ==
=== Member of the Italian Parliament, 2006–2018 ===
A member of the national parliament since the 2006 elections who was elected in Umbria on the list of L'Ulivo, Gozi again advised then-prime minister Prodi on European Union (EU) politics until 2008, and later served as chairman of the parliamentary committee on Schengen, Europol and immigration affairs.

In 2007, he was one of the founders of the Democratic Party (PD) as a member of the national leadership, and elected to the national assembly of the party for the Democrats for Veltroni faction. Between 2008 and 2013, he headed the PD delegation in the parliamentary committee for European affairs, and he was in charge at national level of EU policies for the PD.

At the 2008 Italian general election, Gozi was re-elected as MP for Umbria for the PD, again serving as head of the party delegation in the parliamentary committee for European affairs. At the 2009 PD leadership election, Gozi served as national manager and Emilia-Romagna coordinator for the Ignazio Marino campaign. Under the new party secretary Pier Luigi Bersani, he then served as president of the Europe Forum of the party and head of the Together for the PD faction. In 2010, Bersani appointed him as responsible for Europe in the party secretariat. That same yeat, Gozi launched a domestic campaign to support the appointment of Mario Draghi, the governor of Banca d'Italia, as next President of the European Central Bank.

From 2011 to 2013, Gozi was ambassador for the Rome bid for the 2020 Summer Olympics. In September 2012, he announced he would run for the 2012 centre-left primary election for the office of President of the Council; he had to withdraw after not being able to collect the required 95 signatures of party delegates. At the 2013 Italian general election, Gozi was elected again as MP for Lombardy for the PD. In addition to his role in the Italian Parliament, Gozi was a member of the Italian delegation to the Parliamentary Assembly of the Council of Europe from 2013 until 2015. In the Assembly, he served on the Committee on Legal Affairs and Human Rights (2013–2015), the Committee on Political Affairs and Democracy (2013–2014), and the Sub-Committee on Human Rights (2014–2015). During that time, he also served as one of the Assembly's vice-presidents, and since January 2014 as vice-president of the Socialist Group in the assembly.

=== Under-Secretary for European Affairs, 2014–2018 ===
On 28 February 2014, Gozi joined the Renzi Cabinet as Under-Secretary for European Affairs in the office of Matteo Renzi. Despite not receiving the title of minister, as his predecessors, Gozi was tasked with coordinating, with the Minister of Foreign Affairs, the six months of Italy's presidency of the EU Council. In 2014 and 2015, he also signed up as member of the Italian Radicals.

In 2014, Gozi and Harlem Désir, the then French Secretary of State for European Affairs, set out a list of priorities after talks in Paris, saying the European Commission should adopt more growth-friendly economic policies and grant maximum flexibility within existing EU budget rules to countries undertaking growth-promoting investments and structural economic reforms. In 2015, Gozi called for a two-speed Europe that would let countries which desired closer integration forge ahead. A year later, he said Italy also wanted a single economy minister for the eurozone answerable to elected governments.

At the 2018 Italian general election, Gozi was candidate for Parliament in his native Emilia-Romagna, where he came in third among the PD candidates and was not elected. In November 2018 in Vienna, he was elected president of the Union of European Federalists. In December 2018, Gozi said he was working, together with Carlo Calenda and +Europa, on a new party for Renzi aimed at gathering the votes of moderates leaving Forza Italia and of disgruntled grillini. On 20 September 2019, he announced his departure towards Italia Viva, Renzi's new centrist party.

=== MEP elected in France ===
In 2019, he was a candidate in the European elections in France, in 22nd place on the Renaissance list Renew Europe, supported by La République En Marche and the centrists of MoDem. He ranked 22nd on the list and remained a member of the Democratic Party in Italy while participating in the elections.

Following the elections, he was elected as one of the five French MEPs who would replace the post- Brexit British MEPs. Meanwhile, at the end of July, he was appointed by Édouard Philippe's government as chargé de mission for European affairs, for which he is criticised by Italian politicians, both by members of the government such as Luigi Di Maio and Matteo Salvini, and by members of his own party such as former Minister of Economic Development Carlo Calenda.

In October 2019, press organs reported that he also worked for Maltese Prime Minister Joseph Muscat; according to Gozi, the collaboration ended when he took office with the French government[25]. As a result of the controversy, he resigned from his post with the French government on 23 October.

On 1 February 2020, he took office as a member of the European Parliament.

On 5 May 2021, he was elected secretary general of the European Democratic Party, succeeding former French Secretary of State for European Affairs Marielle de Sarnez, who died prematurely in January of the same year.

On 14 January 2023, the constituent assembly of the European Liberal Democrat Party was held in Milan, Italy, with ‘the aim of contributing to the creation of a unitary liberal democratic party in the wake of Renew Europe, the group comprising liberals and democrats in the European Parliament. An objective shared with the parties Azione and Italia Viva, together with which it is necessary to start a founding path’. Among the founders are Sandro Gozi, Oscar Giannino, Alessandro De Nicola and Giuseppe Benedetto.

In February 2026, he ran in the Paris municipal elections with the Mouvement Démocrate (MoDem), on the list led by Rachida Dati and supported by a centre-right and centrist coalition. On 23 March 2026, he was elected to the Council of Paris, the municipal assembly of the French capital.

== European Elections 2024: Member of Team Europe ==
On 8 March 2024, the Assembly of Delegates of the European Democratic Party held at the Leopolda in Florence designated Secretary General Sandro Gozi as the representative of the EDP in ‘Team Europe’, the team of three that will lead the European campaign ‘Renew Europe Now’ in the 2024 European Elections. In addition to Gozi, Renew's ‘Team Europe’ is composed of Marie-Agnes Strack-Zimmermann of ALDE and Valérie Hayer of Renaissance.

== Legal proceedings ==
On 15 April 2019, the Single Court of the Republic of San Marino created a register of suspects for an alleged “phantom” consultancy with the San Marino Central Bank on the “regulatory adjustment to harmonize relations with the EU”. An investigation was launched against Gozi and the president of the BCSM, Catia Tomasetti. However, on 2 July 2020 the same court dismissed the criminal proceedings against Gozi and Tomasetti, citing no relevant conduct against them.

Unfortunately, the Commissioner of the Law, Alberto Buriani, who had opened the investigation in 2019, was remanded for trial for offences of false testimony and attempted extortion. He was in conspiracy with Simone Celli, former Secretary of State of the Republic of San Marino, and was charged against President Tomasetti for facts related to that investigation. Buriani was also remanded for trial in conspiracy with third parties for violating the investigative secret and official secrecy related to the investigation concerning Gozi and Tomasetti.

On 8 February 2024, the trial of former Secretary of State Simone Celli and former Law Commissioner Alberto Buriani ended with a sentence of one year for Celli (for attempted bribery, one year imprisonment with a suspended sentence) and four years for Buriani (for attempted bribery and abuse of authority, a total of four years imprisonment and five years' disqualification from public office).

== Honours ==
- Legion of Honour - Paris, President François Hollande, January 2014
- Ordre des Palmes académiques - 2007
- National Order of Merit (Malta) - "For his contribution to European integration and his dedicated work in developing the European project" - Valletta - 13 December 2016
- European Western Balkans Award - For his principled advocacy for the enlargement of the European Union to the Western Balkans, including in his role as European Parliament Rapporteur on the institutional consequences of enlargement, as well as for his efforts in promoting European values in the candidate countries of the region. - Brussels - 10 December 2025

== Books ==
- Sandro Gozi, ‘The European Commission. Decision-making processes and executive powers', Bologna, Il Mulino, 2005, ISBN 9788815107466
- Sandro Gozi, ‘Non! Ce n'est pas la faute à Bruxelles", Paris, Editions le Manuscrit, 2007, ISBN 9782748186741
- Sandro Gozi, ‘Il governo dell'Europa’, Bologna, Il Mulino, 2011, ISBN 9788815084156
- Sandro Gozi, ‘Playlist Italia. La sinistra e il coraggio di cambiare musica", Acireale, Bonanno, 2013, ISBN 9788896950142
- Sandro Gozi (with Marielle de Sarnez), ‘L'urgence européenne’, Marseille, Editions Thaddée, 2014, ISBN 978-2919131150
- Sandro Gozi (with Marielle de Sarnez), ‘L'urgence européenne’, Acireale, Bonanno, 2014, ISBN 978-8877967459
- Sandro Gozi, ‘Generazione Erasmus al potere. The courage of responsibility', Milan, Università Bocconi Editore, 2016, ISBN 9788883502330
- Sandro Gozi, ‘Generation Europe’, Lanham (Maryland), Rowman & Littlefield International Ltd., 2018, ISBN 978-1-78660-792-8
- Sandro Gozi, ‘La Cible’, Paris, Saint-Simon, 2020, ISBN 978-2374350233
- Sandro Gozi, ‘Pour une Europe-puissance, souveraine et démocratique’, Geneva, Centre d'impression de l'Université de Genève, 2021, ISBN 978-2-8399-3169-4
- Sandro Gozi, ‘The Target. Battaglie per l'Europa', Naples, Editoriale Scientifica, 2021 ISBN 979-1259760142
