= Public Space (Italian political party) =

Political party in Italy

Public Space Spazio Pubblico
- Abbreviation: SP
- Founders: Pina Picierno
- Founded: 7 June 2026; 4 months ago
- Split from: Democratic Party
- Ideology: Liberalism; Pro-Europeanism
- Political position: Centre
- European affiliation: European Democratic Party
- European Parliament group: Renew Europe
- Colors: Orange
- Chamber of Deputies: 0 / 400
- Senate: 0 / 205
- European Parliament: 1 / 76
- Regional Councils: 0 / 896

Website
- www.spaziopubblico.eu

Public Space (Italian: Spazio Pubblico, SP) is a liberal political party in Italy.

== History ==
On 7 June 2026, Member of the European Parliament Pina Picierno announced to Il Foglio that she was leaving the Democratic Party (PD), criticising the leadership of Elly Schlein. Picierno accused Schlein of showing too little commitment to supporting Ukraine and of increasingly going populist. On 7 June, Picierno announced the foundation of the political movement on an interview for La Stampa and Corriere della Sera newspapers. Picierno described the new outfit as a pro-European, democratic, and reformist movement with the goal to bring together similar political parties. Paola Concia, a former member of the PD, joined the movement as well. On the same day, Picierno announced her willingness to join the European Democratic Party. On 16 June, she was admitted as a member of the Renew Europe group in the European Parliament. On 17 July, the movement Adesso!, founded by Tomaso Greco, joined the party. On 9 September, the association Aurora for Marche joined Public Space. On 5 October, Public Space has been admitted as a full member of the European Democratic Party.
