= European Democratic Party =

Centrist European political party

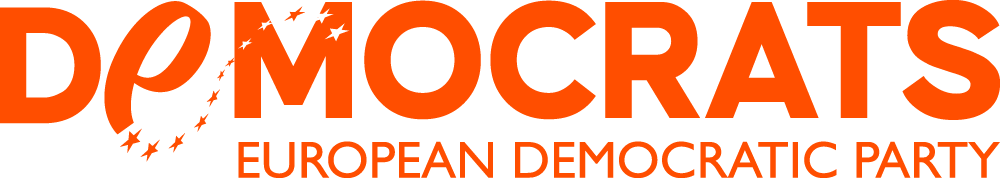
- Abbreviation: EDP
- President: François Bayrou (FR)
- Secretary-General: Sandro Gozi (IT)
- Executive Vice-Presidents: Christine Singer (DE); Aitor Esteban (ES)
- Founded: 9 December 2004; 21 years ago
- Split from: European People's Party
- Headquarters: Rue Montoyer 25, 1000 Brussels, Belgium
- Think tank: Institute of European Democrats
- Youth wing: Young Democrats for Europe
- Membership (22 December 2025): 6
- Ideology: European federalism
- Political position: Centre
- European Parliament group: Renew Europe
- Colours: Orange
- European Parliament: 12 / 720
- European Commission: 0 / 27
- European Council: 0 / 27
- EU lower/unicameral houses: 78 / 6,217
- EU upper houses: 28 / 1,459

Website
- democrats.eu

The European Democratic Party (EDP; French: Parti démocrate européen, PDE), also known as the European Democrats, is a centrist European political party in favour of European integration. Within the European Parliament, its MEPs form the Renew Europe group, together with those of the Alliance of Liberals and Democrats for Europe party and the French Renaissance party. The President is François Bayrou.

The youth wing of the EDP is the Young Democrats for Europe (YDE).

As of 2026, EDP members participate in the national government of two EU member states: Les Engagés in Belgium, which participates in the government of Prime Minister Bart De Wever and, EDP individual member Marian Harkin, who participates in the government of Taoiseach Micheál Martin. Two European regions are also led by an EDP politician, with Spain's Basque Country being led by Imanol Pradales of the Basque Nationalist Party and with Spain's Canary Islands being led by Fernando Clavijo Batlle of the Canarian Coalition; EDP member Free Voters participates as a junior coalition partner in the state government of Bavaria in Germany, as does Italia Viva in Emilia-Romagna, Tuscany, Campania and Basilicata and Les Engagés in Wallonia and the Wallonia-Brussels Federation.

The European Democratic Party is also a member of the European Movement International and was a member of the World Alliance of Democrats until its dissolution in 2012.

== History ==
The European Democratic Party was initiated on 16 April 2004 and formally founded on 9 December 2004 in Brussels.

In 2005, the European Democratic Party, together with the United States Democratic Party and the Council of Asian Liberals and Democrats, co-founded the Alliance of Democrats international.

François Bayrou of the Union for French Democracy and later the Democratic Movement (MoDem) and Francesco Rutelli, former leader of the Democracy is Freedom and Alliance for Italy parties, served as the two co-presidents until 2019. Now, François Bayrou serves as the only president.

The EDP was founded in reaction to the rising influence of Eurosceptic parties within European institutions. It drew pro-European centrist parties from the European People's Party (EPP) group to form a new centrist multinational bloc. Its co-founder François Bayrou described it as a party for people being neither conservative nor socialist."

Since the beginning of the 6th European Parliament of 2004–2009, the EDP has formed a joint European parliamentary group with the Alliance of Liberals and Democrats for Europe Party called the Alliance of Liberals and Democrats for Europe (ALDE) group. This parliamentary group was renamed in 2019 as Renew Europe.

The European Democratic Party is ideologically centrist and federalist. Some major members and affiliated parties like EAJ-PNV, Free Voters, MoDem, MCC, Canarian Coalition and the disbanded Democracy is Freedom – The Daisy follow a Christian democratic or liberal conservative line.

At its 20th anniversary congress in Brussels in December 2024, the party adopted a new orange brand identity and logo, taking on the short name ‘Democrats’.

== Political positions ==
Beyond internal party matters, the EDP has taken public positions on rule-of-law and democratic backsliding in EU candidate countries. In August 2026, the party and Secretary-General Sandro Gozi questioned the "necessity and proportionality" of Tirana Mayor Erion Veliaj's prolonged pre-trial detention, while Gozi also met with Albanian civil society figures amid anti-corruption protests calling for stronger democratic safeguards. The party has taken a similar stance toward Turkey, where the authorities have held Istanbul mayor, Ekrem İmamoğlu. The EDP has described pressure on opposition politicians, universities and journalists there as a "systematic" pattern of democratic backsliding.

== Membership ==
Members are national and regional political parties as well as members of the European Parliament, national and regional parliaments.

=== Current members ===
Country or Region	Party	Leader	MEPs (Note: The number of MEPs listed below may not match the total number of MEPs of the European party, as it does not include MEPs who join as individual members.)	National lower houses	National upper houses	Position in national legislature
Austria	Citizens' Forum Austria; Bürgerforum Österreich (FRITZ)	Andrea Haselwanter-Schneider	-	-	-	Extra-parliamentary
Belgium	Les Engagés; Les Engagés (LE)	Yvan Verougstraete	1 / 8	14 / 150	5 / 60	Government
Belgium	Marie-Christine Marghem (MR and MCC; Individual member)	-	-	1 / 150	-	Government
Croatia	People's Party – Reformists; Narodna stranka – Reformisti (NS-R)	Radimir Čačić	-	-	-	Extra-parliamentary
Cyprus	ALMA – Citizens for Cyprus; ΑΛΜΑ – Πολίτες για την Κύπρο	Odysseas Michaelides	-	4 / 56	-	Opposition
Czech Republic	SEN 21	Václav Láska	-	0 / 200	4 / 81	Opposition
France	Democratic Movement; Mouvement démocrate (MoDem)	François Bayrou	2 / 81	48 / 577	4 / 348	Government
France	Sandro Gozi (MoDem / IV; individual member)	-	1 / 81	-	-	—
Germany	Free Voters; Freie Wähler (FW)	Hubert Aiwanger	3 / 96	0 / 735	2 / 69	Extra-parliamentary
Germany	Party of Progress; Partei des Fortschritts (PdF)	Lukas Sieper; Michelle Kahlich	1 / 96	0 / 735	0 / 69	Extra-parliamentary
Greece	Democrats – Progressive Centre; Δημοκράτες – Προοδευτικό Κέντρο	Stefanos Kasselakis	-	4 / 300 (Note: Τhe party has no parliamentary group, however 4 independent members of the Greek parliament are members of the party)	-	Extra-parliamentary
Hungary	Everybody's Hungary People's Party; Mindenki Magyarországa Néppárt (MMN)	Péter Márki-Zay	-	-	-	Extra-parliamentary
Italy	Italia Viva; Italia Viva (IV)	Matteo Renzi	-	7 / 400	8 / 200	Opposition
Italy	Public Space; Spazio Pubblico	Pina Picierno	1 / 76	-	-	Extra-parliamentary
Italy	New Times – United Populars; Tempi Nuovi – Popolari Uniti	Giuseppe Fioroni	-	-	-	Extra-parliamentary
Ireland	Independent Ireland (II); Éire Neamhspleách	Michael Collins	1 / 14	4 / 174	0 / 60	Opposition
Ireland	Marian Harkin (Independent; Individual member)	-	-	1 / 174	-	Government
Malta	Momentum (M)	Arnold Cassola	-	-	-	Extra-parliamentary
Netherlands	50PLUS (50+)	Martin van Rooijen	-	0 / 150	1 / 75	Opposition
Poland	Alliance of Democrats; Stronnictwo Demokratyczne	Paweł Piskorski	-	-	-	Extra-parliamentary
Portugal	Together for the People; Juntos pelo Povo (JPP)	Élvio Sousa	-	1 / 230	-	Opposition
San Marino	Future Republic; Repubblica Futura (RF)	Mario Venturini	Not in EU	6 / 60	-	Opposition
Spain	Basque Nationalist Party; Euzko Alderdi Jeltzalea (EAJ); Partido Nacionalista Vasco (PNV)	Aitor Esteban	1 / 61	6 / 350	10 / 265	Confidence and supply
Spain	Together for Catalonia; Junts per Catalunya (Junts)	Carles Puigdemont	0 / 61	7 / 350	4 / 265	Opposition
Spain	Canarian Coalition; Coalición Canaria (CC)	Fernando Clavijo Batlle	-	1 / 350	1 / 265	Confidence and supply
Spain	Commitment to Galicia; Compromiso por Galicia (CxG)	Juan Carlos Piñeiro	-	-	-	Extra-parliamentary

=== Former members ===
- Croatia : National Forum (Nacionalni forum), joined EDP in 2014, disbanded in 2015
- Cyprus:
  - European Party
  - Citizens' Alliance
- Czech Republic:
  - Party for the Open Society
  - Way to Change, founding member of EDP, disbanded in 2009
- France:
  - Union for French Democracy, founding member of EDP, disbanded in 2007, succeeded by MoDem
  - Union of Democrats and Independents joined the ALDE party on 2 December 2016
- Hungary:
  - New Start dissolved in 24 February 2025
- Italy:
  - Democracy is Freedom – The Daisy, founding member of EDP, merged into the Democratic Party in 2007, MEPs Mario Pirillo, Silvia Costa and Vittorio Prodi stayed as individual members until 2014, now member of PES
  - Alliance for Italy, party disbanded by the end of 2016
  - European Democratic Party Italy (Partito Democratico Europeo Italia) disbanded in 2021.
  - Action, left in September 2023
  - L'Italia c'è, left in 2025
- Lithuania: Labour Party, left in 2012 to join the ALDE party
- Portugal
  - Democratic Republican Party, joined EDP in 2015, succeeded by National Democratic Alternative in 2021
  - National Democratic Alternative, left EDP in 2022, due to ideological divergencies regarding the LGBT community
- Romania
  - PRO Romania (PRO România), left in 2022 to join Party of European Socialists
  - Association of Italians of Romania, left in 2022
- Slovakia:
  - People's Party – Movement for a Democratic Slovakia, joined EDP in 2009, disbanded in 2014, succeeded by Democratic Slovakia Party
  - Democratic Slovakia Party ('Strana Demokratického Slovenska') and European Democratic Party (Europska Demokraticka Strana) in 2019
  - Alena Bašistová (Independent), not reelected in 2020
- Slovenia: Democratic Party of Pensioners of Slovenia, joined EDP in 2019, succeeded by Party of Generations in 2024

=== Individual members ===
The EDP also includes a number of individual members, although, as most other European parties, it has not sought to develop mass individual membership.

Below is the evolution of individual membership of the EDP since 2019.

== Funding ==
As a registered European political party, the EDP is entitled to European public funding, which it has received continuously since 2004.

Below is the evolution of European public funding received by the EDP.

In line with the Regulation on European political parties and European political foundations, the EDP also raises private funds to co-finance its activities. As of 2025, European parties must raise at least 10% of their reimbursable expenditure from private sources, while the rest can be covered using European public funding. (Note: For the purpose of European party funding, "contributions" refer to financial or in-kind support provided by party members, while "donations" refer to the same but provided by non-members.)

Below is the evolution of contributions and donations received by the EDP.

== Elected representatives of member parties ==
=== European institutions ===
Organisation	Institution	Number of seats
European Union	European Parliament	12 / 720 (2%)
European Union	European Commission	0 / 27 (0%)
European Union	European Council (Heads of Government)	0 / 27 (0%)
European Union	Council of the European Union (Participation in Government)	
European Union	Committee of the Regions	11 / 329 (3%)
Council of Europe	Parliamentary Assembly	

== See also ==
- European political party
- Authority for European Political Parties and European Political Foundations
- European political foundation
