= Alliance of Democrats (political international) =

Loose political international which operated from 2005 to 2012

- Formation: 2005
- Dissolved: 2012
- Location(s): Brussels and Washington, D.C.
- Region served: Worldwide
- Members: 42
- Co-chaired: François Bayrou; Francesco Rutelli; Ellen Tauscher
- Website: www.allianceofdemocrats.org

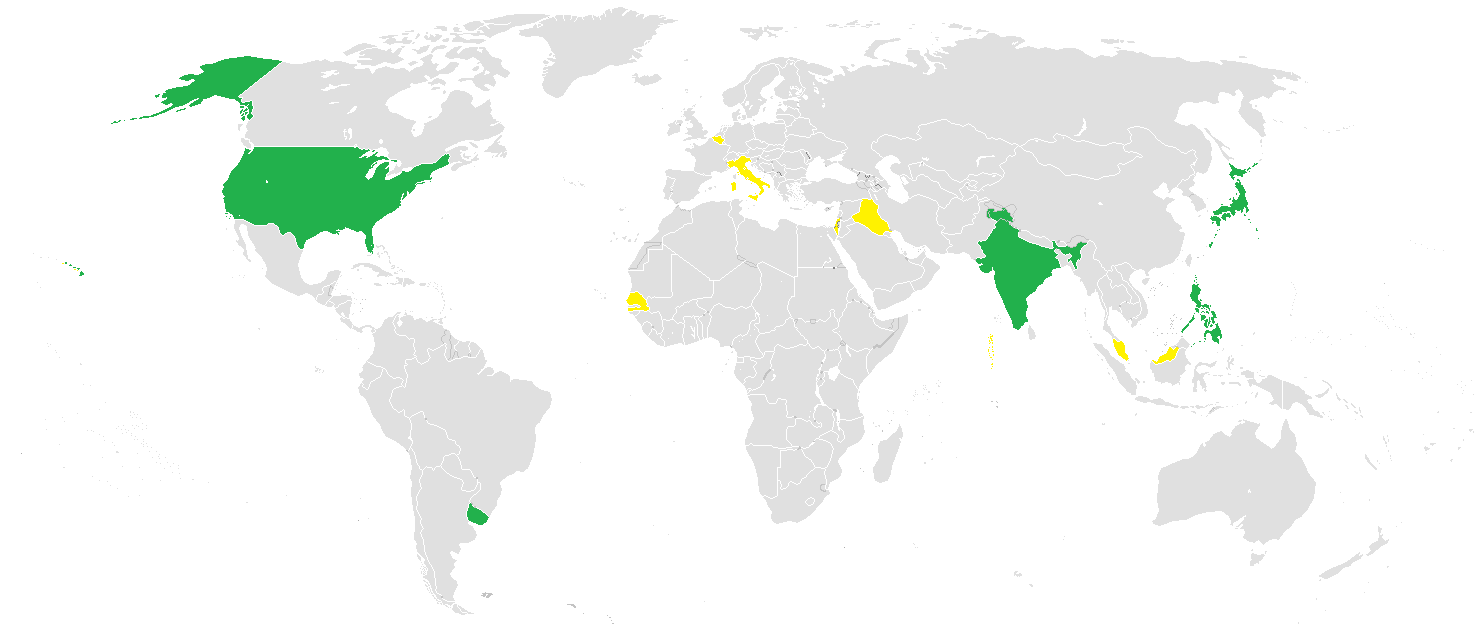
Member parties who lead the government coalition are in green. Countries with member parties who are part of the government coalition, but do not lead it, are in yellow (as of June 2012).

The Alliance of Democrats was a loose political international which operated from 2005 to 2012. While it did not publish an official manifesto, it consisted of a broad array of political parties that identified as centre-right, centrist, and centre-left. It was founded by the United States Democratic Party, the European Democratic Party (EDP) and the Council of Asian Liberals and Democrats (CALD).

The Alliance included members of the Centrist Democrat International (such as the Christian Democrat Party of Chile and the Democratic Union of Catalonia) and the Liberal International (such as all members of the Council of Asian Liberals and Democrats), as well as former members of Socialist International (the Indian National Congress), Israel's relatively new Kadima party, and conservative parties such as the Democratic Party of Serbia, which is also member of the International Democrat Union.

The Alliance was co-chaired by François Bayrou, Francesco Rutelli and Ellen Tauscher, while after 2008 Gianni Vernetti, who was also co-president of the Italian Liberal Group, was the Alliance's coordinator.

== Past members ==
=== National parties and groups ===
Country	Party
Andorra	Liberal Party of Andorra
Belgium	Citizens' Movement for Change
Burma	National Council of the Union of Burma
Cambodia	Sam Rainsy Party
Chile	Christian Democrat Party of Chile
Cyprus	European Party
Dominican Republic	Dominican Revolutionary Party
Egypt	Democratic Front Party
France	Democratic Movement
Hong Kong	Democratic Party
India	Indian National Congress
Indonesia	Indonesian Democratic Party – Struggle
Iraqi Kurdistan	Kurdistan Democratic Party of Iraq
Israel	Kadima
Italy	Alliance for Italy
Japan	Democratic Party of Japan
Kazakhstan	Democratic Party
Lithuania	Labour Party
Malaysia	Malaysian People's Movement Party
Maldives	Maldivian Democratic Party
Philippines	Liberal Party
San Marino	Popular Alliance
Senegal	Senegalese Democratic Party
Serbia	Democratic Party of Serbia
Singapore	Singapore Democratic Party
Slovakia	People's Party - Movement for a Democratic Slovakia
South Africa	Democratic Alliance
Spain	Basque National Party
Spain	Democratic Union of Catalonia
Sri Lanka	Liberal Party of Sri Lanka
Sudan	Liberal Party
Taiwan	Democratic Progressive Party
Thailand	Democrat Party
United Kingdom	Policy Network
United States	Democratic Party
Uruguay	Broad Front

=== International coalitions ===
Region	Party
Africa	Alliance of Liberals and Democrats from the African Caribbean and Pacific
Asia	Council of Asian Liberals and Democrats
European Union	Alliance of Liberals and Democrats for Europe
European Union	European Democratic Party

=== Notable individual members ===
- (Afghanistan) Shukria Barakzai (Afghan politician and Muslim feminist)
- (Spain) Pasqual Maragall (former president of the Generalitat de Catalunya)
- (Lithuania) Ona Juknevičienė (MEP, EDP member)
- (Poland) Paweł Piskorski (MEP, EDP member)
- Yolande Mukagasana (writer, witness to the genocide in Rwanda)

== Leadership ==
- Co-Chairs: François Bayrou, Francesco Rutelli, Gianni Vernetti and Ellen Tauscher (2005–...)
- Coordinator: Gianni Vernetti (2008–...)
