= National Forum (Croatia) =

National Forum Nacionalni forum
- Leader: Nikica Gabrić
- Founded: 8 December 2013
- Dissolved: 2015
- Headquarters: Zagreb
- Ideology: Pro-Europeanism
- Political position: Centre
- European affiliation: European Democratic Party
- Colours: Blue
- Seats in Sabor: 0 / 151
- European Parliament: 0 / 11

National Forum (Croatian: Nacionalni forum, abbreviation NF) was a citizen association and a political party (officially registered on February 1, 2014) in Croatia, founded by Nikica Gabrić.

On March 1, 2014, NF announced a coalition with Croatian Social Liberal Party (HSLS) for upcoming European Parliament election. Later, they formed that coalition, together with Alliance of Primorje-Gorski Kotar (PGS) and List for Fiume. The party joined the European Democratic Party (EDP) on 30 April 2014.

== Political program ==
Party's political program was focused on stimulating economic growth and employment, especially of the young, educated and talented people who are waiting for their chance on the Employment Exchange, and demography, which is crucial for the existence of the Croatian people. Party's program also placed emphasis on anti-corruption measures, considering it is high time to abolish the unjust rule of a handful of privileged individuals whose particular interests are placed ahead of the common good.

== Electoral history ==
=== European Parliament ===
| Election | In coalition with | Votes won (coalition totals) | Percentage | Seats won | Change | Affiliation |
|---|---|---|---|---|---|---|
| 2014 | HSLS-PGS-RI | 22,098 | 2.4% | 0 / 11 | Steady | EDP |
