= Primošten =

- Municipality
- Općina Primošten; Municipality of Primošten
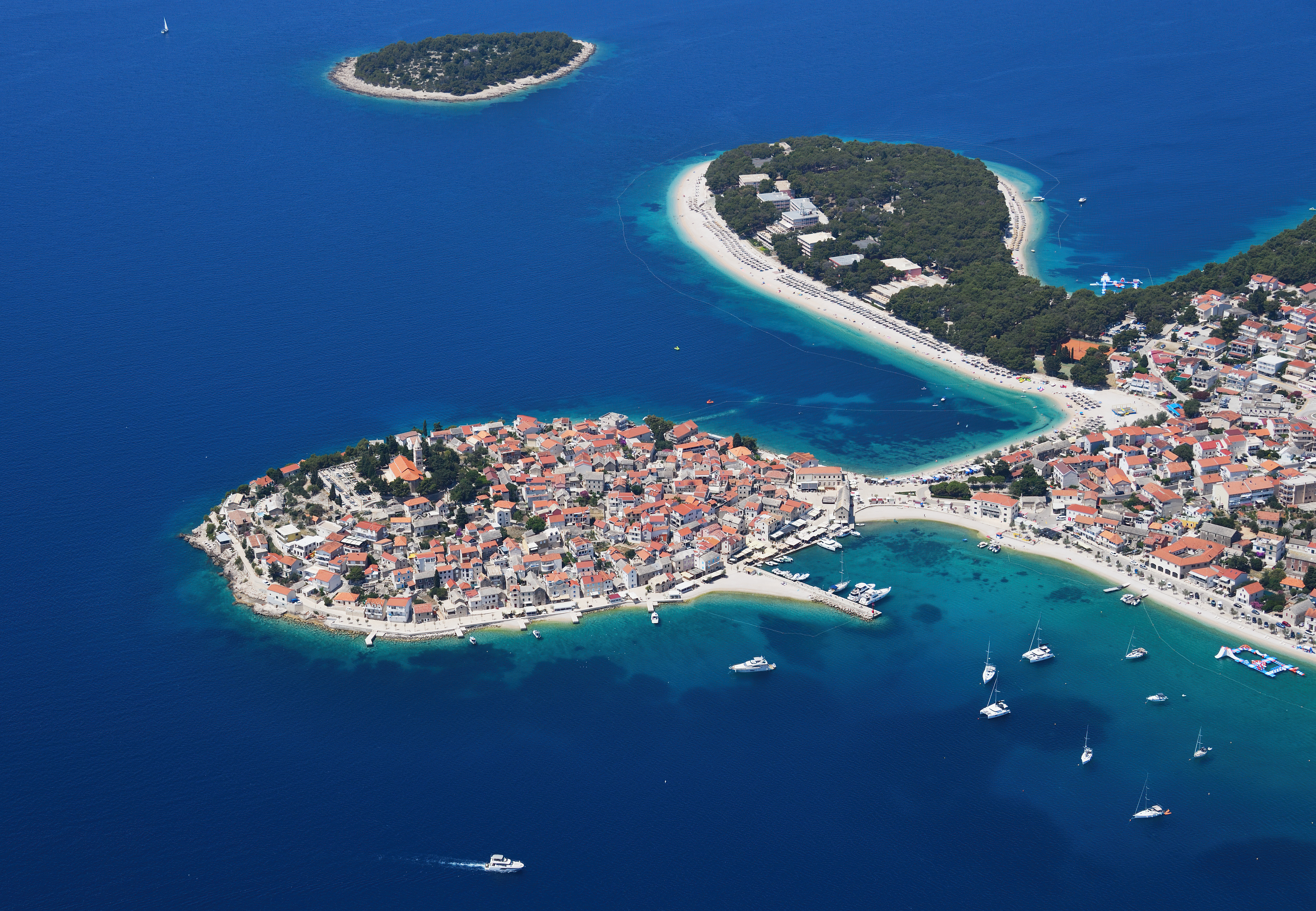
- Aerial view of Primošten
- Interactive map of Primošten
- Location of Primošten within Croatia
- Coordinates: 43°35′15″N 15°55′35″E
- Country: Croatia
- Region: Dalmatia
- County: Šibenik-Knin County

Government
  - Municipal mayor: Stipe Petrina (NLSP)

Area
  - Municipality: 58.5 km^{2} (22.6 sq mi)
  - Urban: 11.4 km^{2} (4.4 sq mi)

Population (2021)
  - Municipality: 2,627
  - Density: 44.9/km^{2} (116/sq mi)
  - Urban: 1,555
  - Urban density: 136/km^{2} (353/sq mi)
- Time zone: UTC+1 (CET)
  - Summer (DST): UTC+2 (CEST)
- Postal code: 22202 Primošten
- Area code: 022
- Vehicle registration: ŠI
- Website: primosten.hr

Primošten (pronounced [prǐmɔʃtɛn]) is a town and municipality in Šibenik-Knin County, Croatia. It is situated between the cities of Šibenik and Trogir, on the Adriatic coast.

== History ==
In the past, Primošten was situated on the islet close to the mainland. During the Ottoman invasions in 1542 the islet was protected by the walls and towers and a draw bridge connected it to the mainland. When the Turks retreated, the draw bridge was replaced by the causeway and in 1564 the settlement was named Primošten after the Croatian verb primostiti (to bridge).

It is built on a hill and is dominated by the parish church of St. George which was built in 1485 and restored in 1760 close to the local graveyard from which a unique view spreads to the sea and the surroundings.

== Demographics ==
In 2021, the municipality had 2,627 residents in the following 7 settlements:

- Kruševo, population 56
- Ložnice, population 41
- Primošten, population 1555
- Primošten Burnji, population 687
- Široke, population 125
- Vadalj, population 90
- Vezac, population 73
Primošten: Population trends 1857–2021
v

population	1463	1742	1884	2221	2659	2724	3700	3551	3500	3546	3331	3216	2991	2956	2992	2828	2627
	1857	1869	1880	1890	1900	1910	1921	1931	1948	1953	1961	1971	1981	1991	2001	2011	2021

Sources: Croatian Bureau of Statistics publications

== Heritage ==
Primošten is known for its huge and beautiful vineyards. A photo of the vineyards of Primošten hung in the UN center in New York. Apart from its vineyards, Primošten is also known for the traditional donkey race that takes place there every summer. The largest beach in Primošten is called Raduča, and its smaller part, Mala Raduča, is voted one of the 10 most beautiful beaches in Croatia. The area's vineyards are currently under consideration to become a UNESCO World Heritage Site.

== Culture and events ==
A manifestation called "Primoštenske užance" is held every year in the middle of the summer in Primošten. It is a traditional folklore festival where people from Primošten exhibit their culture and the former way of living in the village.

== Gallery ==
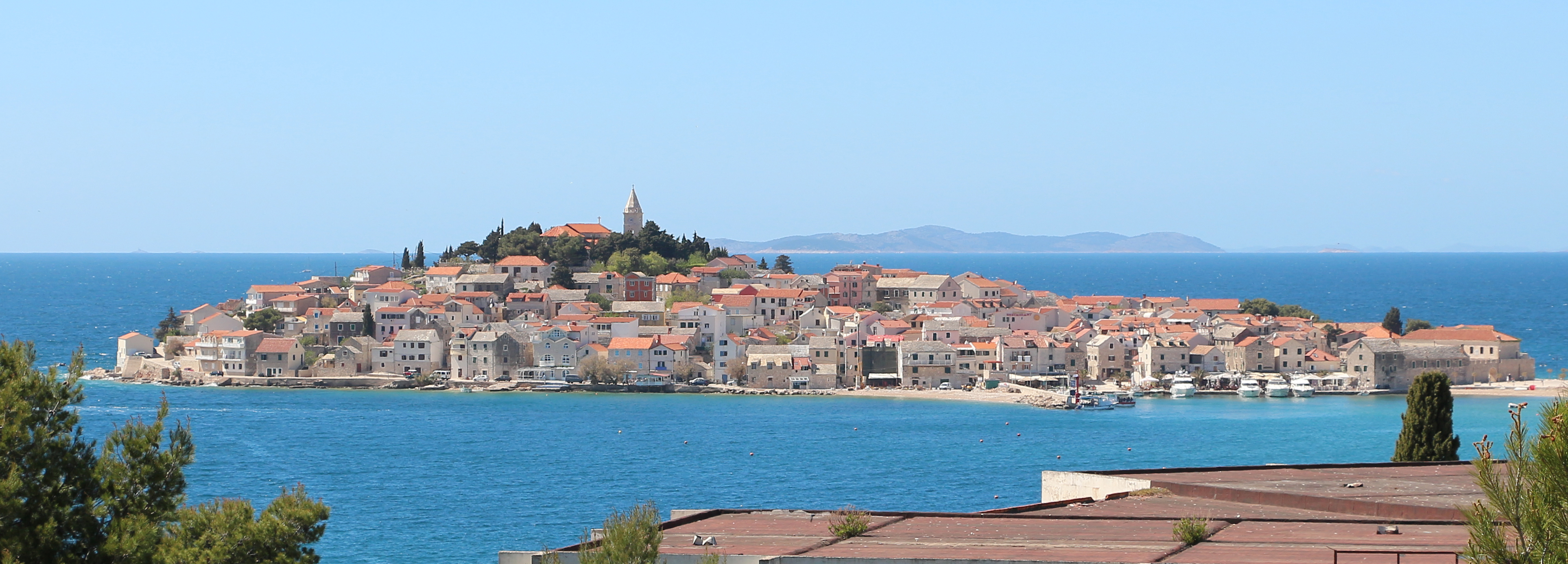
View of Primošten

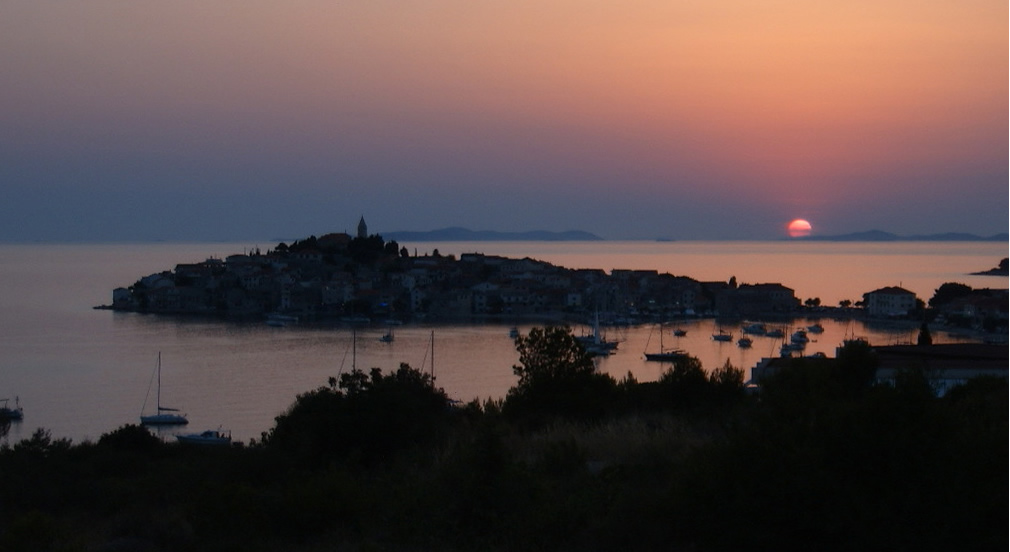
Sunset in Primošten

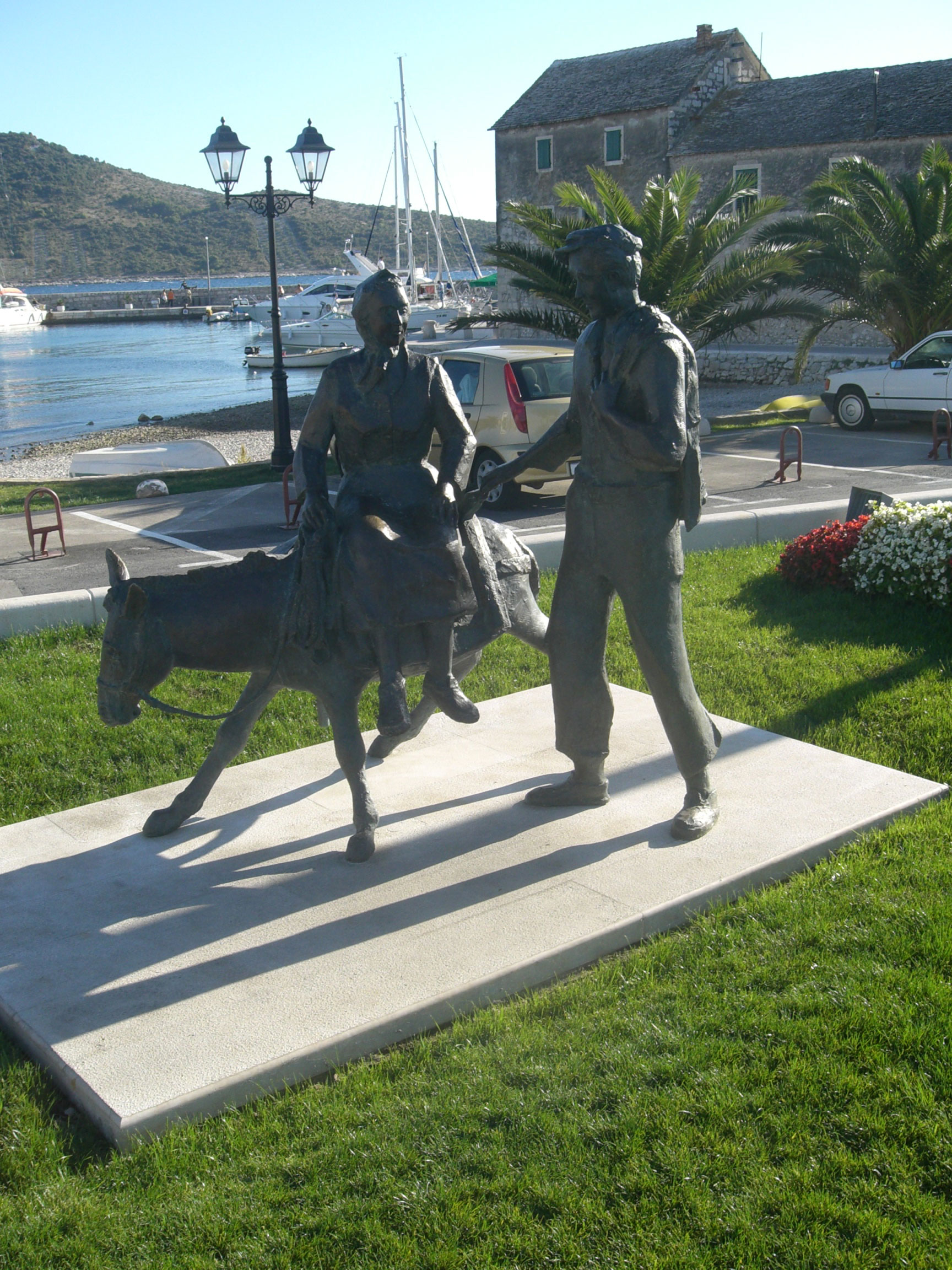
Memorial in the center of Primošten

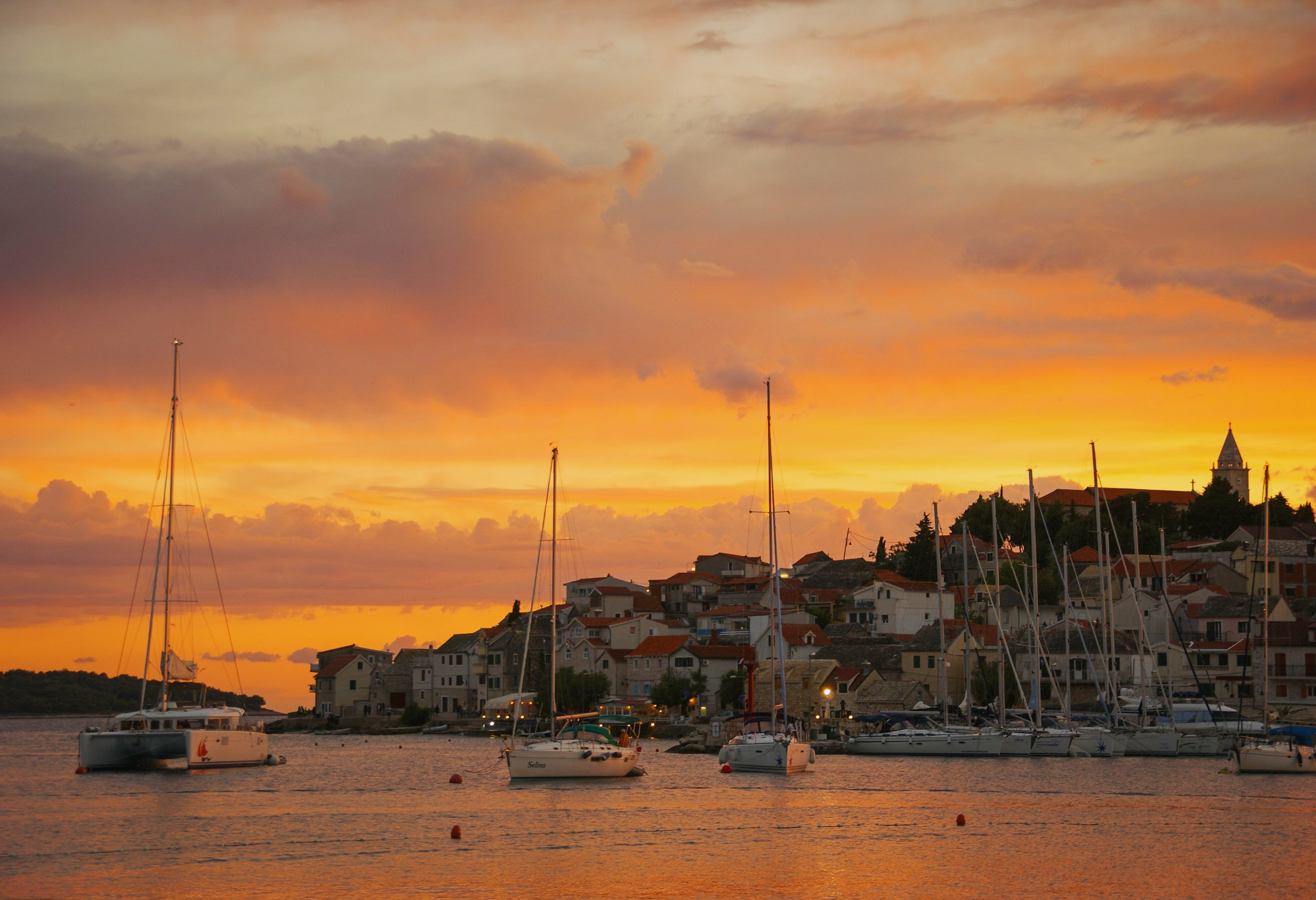
Sunset in Primošten

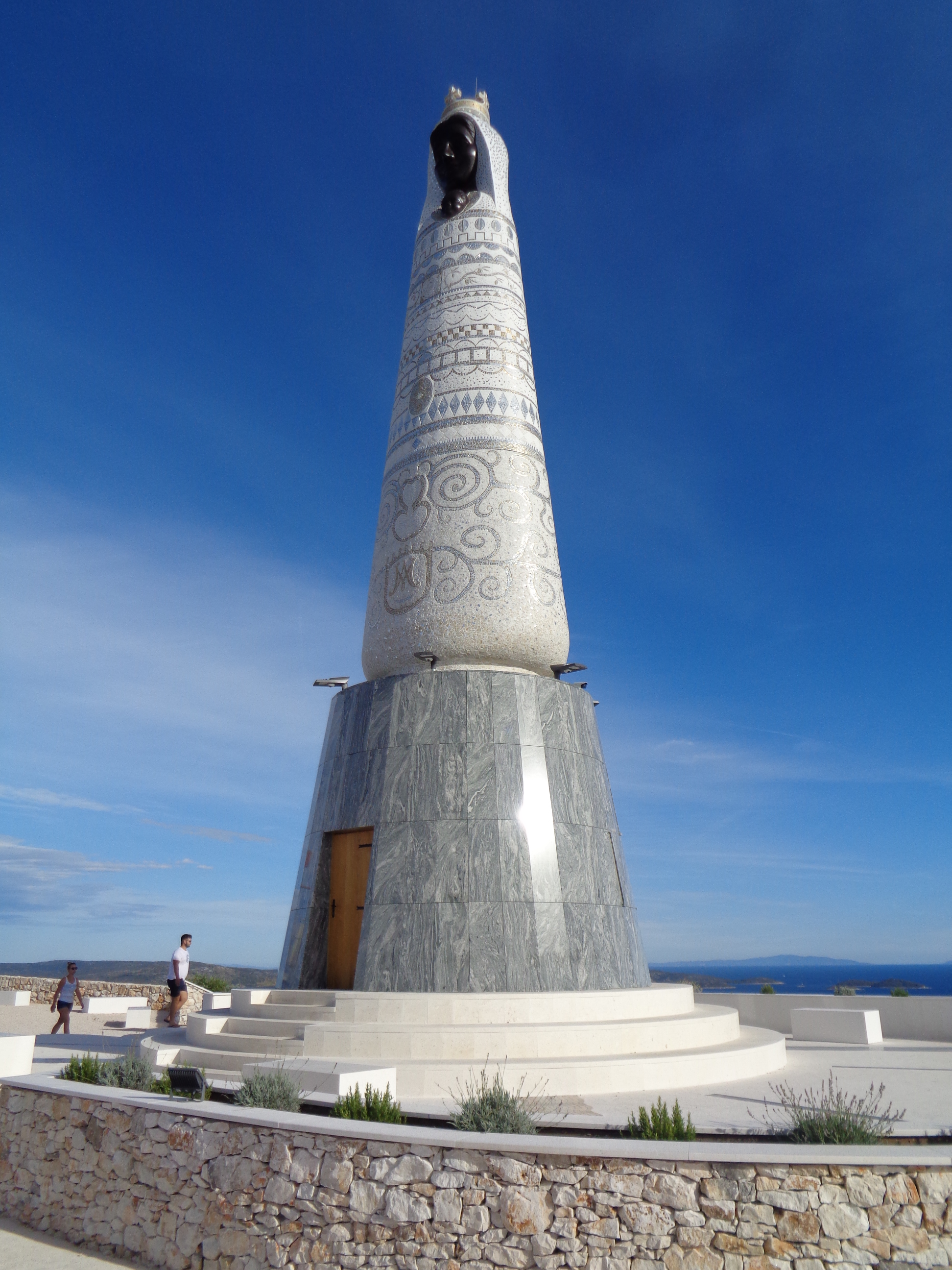
Our Lady of Loreto monument at Primošten

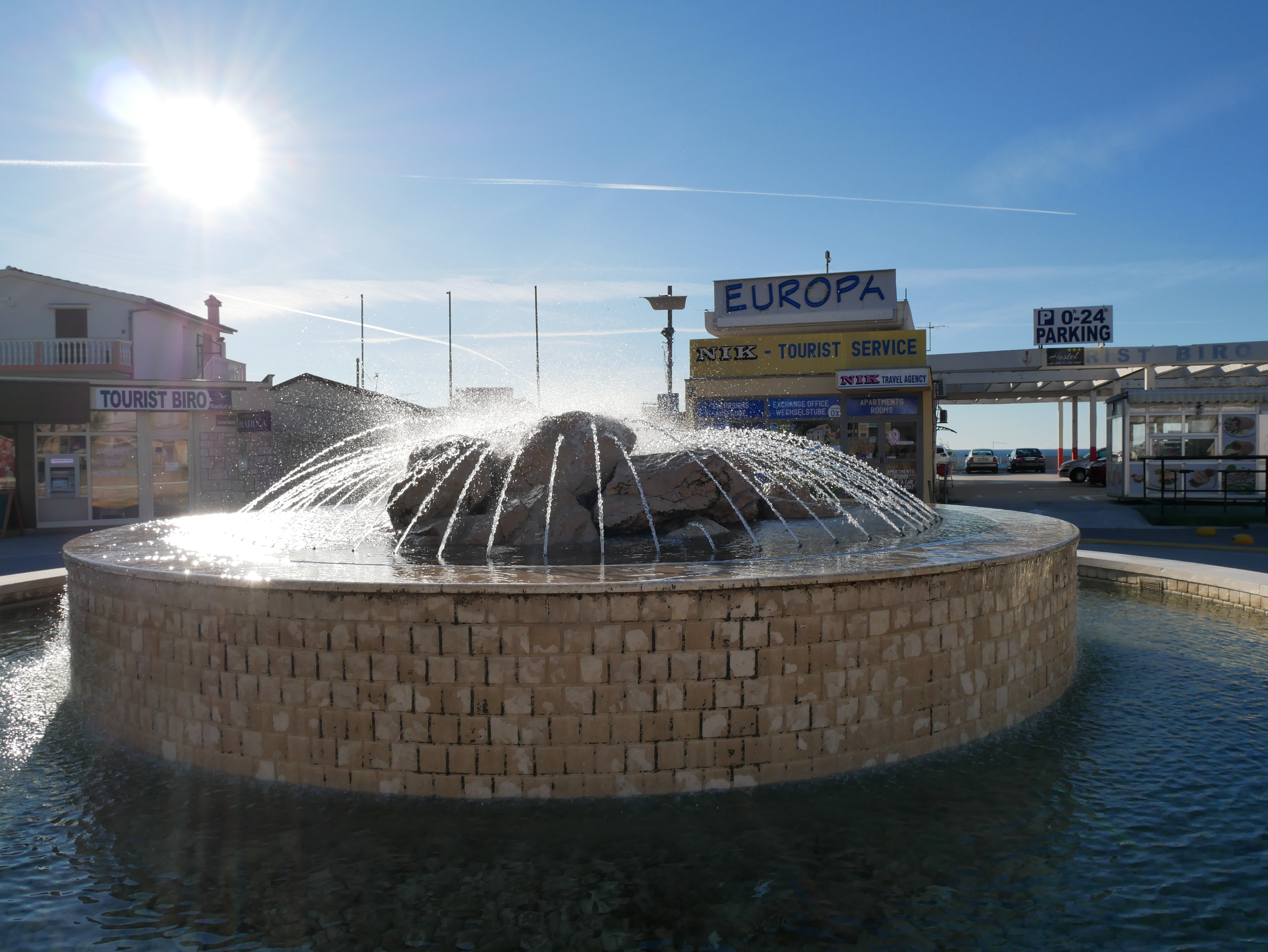
Fountain in the center of Primošten

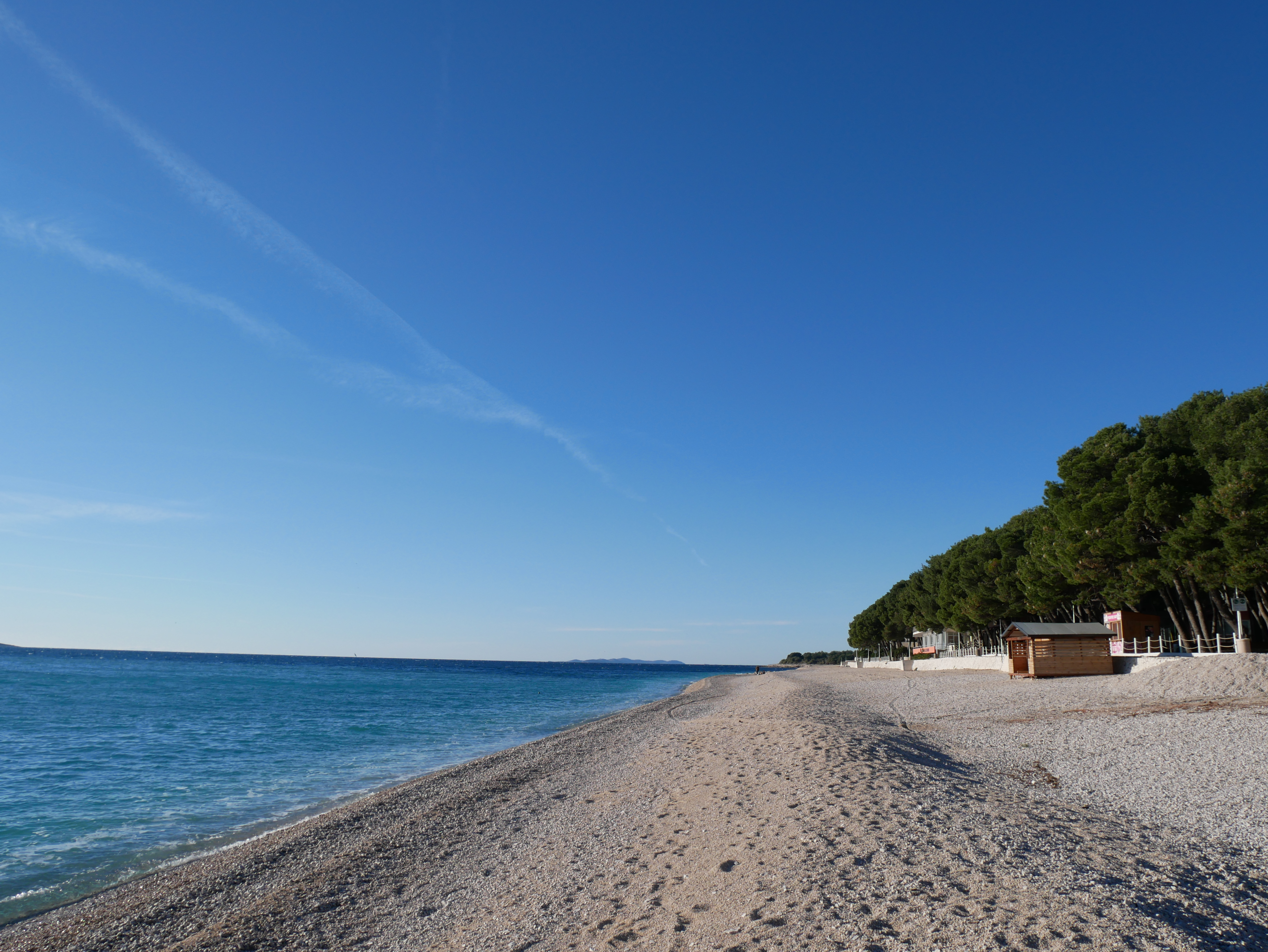
Beach in Primošten

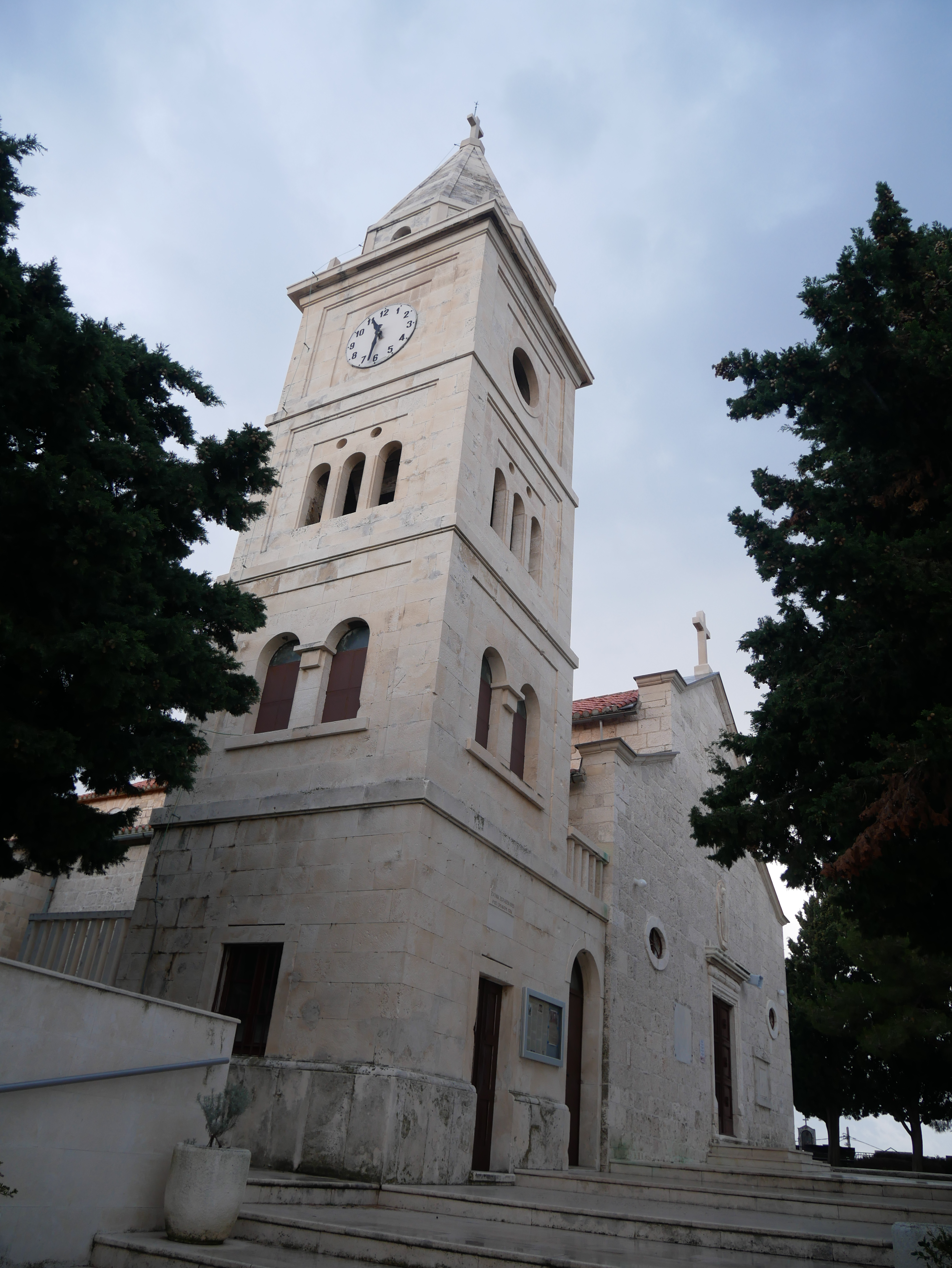
Church of St. George - bell tower

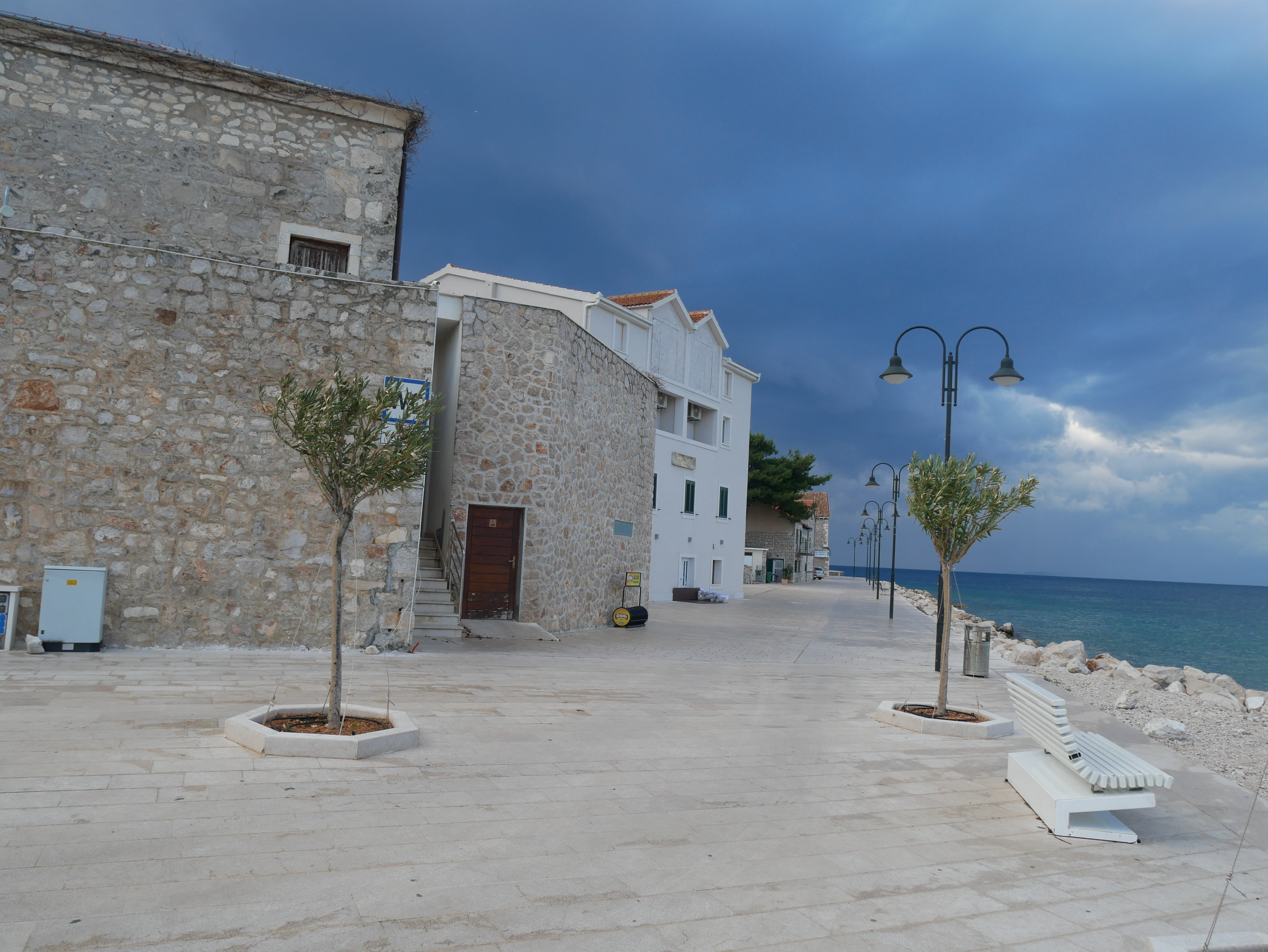
Promenade alongside Primošten

== Sport ==
- JK Primošten (sailing)
- MNK Primošten (futsal)
- RK Spongiola (diving)
- VK Primošten (waterpolo)
- BK Primošten (cycling)

== See also ==
- Tentative list of World Heritage Sites in Croatia
