= Stipe Petrina =

Croatian politician

Mayor of Primošten
- Incumbent
- Assumed office June 2005
- Deputy: Jerko Prgin

Member of Parliament
- In office 28 December 2015 – 14 October 2016
- Constituency: IX electoral district

President of Primošten municipality council
- In office June 2001 – June 2005

Personal details
- Born: 5 October 1954 (age 70); Primošten, PR Croatia, FPR Yugoslavia
- Political party: Independent List Stipe Petrina
- Spouse: Anita Vidović
- Children: 3

Stipe Petrina (born 5 October 1954) is a Croatian politician serving his sixth term as Mayor of Primošten. He is known for his controversial public appearances and statements, and has been described as enfant terrible of Croatian politics.

== Biography ==
He was born in Primošten. After finishing primary school in 1969 in Primošten, he moved to Zagreb to study engineering, graduating from high school in 1974. From 1976 to 1990, he worked as a seaman for various domestic and foreign shipping companies. In January 1990, he organized the first democratic elections in the local community of Primošten, becoming its secretary. He is a volunteer and a veteran of the Croatian War of Independence; he retired in 1995.

== Political career ==
In 2001, at the local elections, he organized the Independent Municipal List, becoming president of the Municipal Council of Primošten. In 2005, he resubmitted his candidacy in local elections with the Independent List, winning 80% of the seats, and became mayor of the municipality of Primošten. In the 2009 local elections in Primošten, he won his second consecutive term as mayor with 80% voter support. He won his third term in 2013, with the support of 68% of voters. Since 2001, Petrina has performed all of his duties in the municipality of Primošten voluntarily and free of charge.

In 2009, he founded the Independent County List that received the support of 9,500 voters, winning eight seats in the Šibenik-Knin County assembly, which turned it into the second most powerful political entity in the county.

in 2011, in the Italian city of Lecce, he was awarded the international tourism award for his contributions to the development of Primošten tourism - Lifetime Achievement Award for Tourism (Per il turismo alla carriera).

Although he accused Božo Petrov, leader of the Bridge of Independent Lists (MOST), that he had a secret agreement with the conservative Croatian Democratic Union (HDZ) and its leader Tomislav Karamarko on how to take over power after 2015 parliamentary election, he eventually joined MOST electoral list and was elected to the Croatian Parliament, but after ensuing months of post-election negotiations and eventual agreement between HDZ and MOST, Petrina left MOST and continued to serve as an independent MP. He ran at the 2016 extraordinary parliamentary election and came in 5th in the 9th electoral district but didn't pass the 5% threshold so he wasn't re-elected to the Parliament.

At the 2017 local elections, he was re-elected as mayor of Primošten, and was elected to the Assembly of the Šibenik-Knin County where his councilors' club has seven members, making it the second largest alongside the one led by the Social Democratic Party of Croatia.

== Controversies ==
Petrina is known for his harsh statements against the Croatian right-center party Croatian Democratic Union (HDZ) and country's institutions and bureaucracy. He has denounced the first Croatian president Franjo Tuđman for impoverishing the Croatian people during the privatization, renaming a street in Primošten that bore his name. HDZ has criticized his actions as "barbaric".

After winning eight seats in the Šibenik-Knin County Assembly, he ignored legal provisions that banned him from serving both in municipal and county institutions, and had to be physically obstructed from attending the sessions by security guards. After managing to change the disputed law in 2013, he was again prevented from attending the sessions, calling the new government formed by the leftist party Social Democratic Party of Croatia the same as HDZ.

Petrina is also known for his colorful language, insulting judges, bureaucrats and other politicians. His initiatives have brought him in the conflict with Croatian Radiotelevision, Hrvatska elektroprivreda, Croatian telecoms and the county water supply company - according to Petrina exposing the lack of rule of law and their abuse as instruments of political power against him.

On February 13, 2014, he won the case at the European Court of Human Rights against the Republic of Croatia. Petrina claimed that he has been convicted in criminal proceedings without having had an opportunity to appear at the hearing. On December 19, 2007, Petrina was found guilty at the Šibenik Municipal Court on the count of attempted grievous bodily harm, and sentenced to four months' imprisonment, suspended for one year. On 10 October 2008 Petrina's appeal was dismissed by the Šibenik County State Attorney's Office, and on 29 April 2010 again at the Croatian Constitutional Court. European Court declared a violation of Article 6 §§ 1 and 3 (c) of the Convention for the Protection of Human Rights and Fundamental Freedoms, ordering the Croatian government to pay EUR 7,300 in damages.

== Public perception ==
According to the results of a survey conducted by 'Šibenik TM' among the citizens of the Šibenik-Knin County in 2011, Petrina was declared the politician who embodies the highest number of desirable and positive qualities. The citizens of the county respected Petrina's courage, enthusiasm, honesty, patriotism, vision and credibility.

He has been described as a person who dominated the political scene of Šibenik and the county during the first decade of the third millennium. "It's not just the frequency of his appearance in the media, but primarily due to the impact that he had on molding the public opinion and political attitudes of citizens.".
