= Pina Picierno =

Italian politician (born 1981)

Pina Picierno MEP
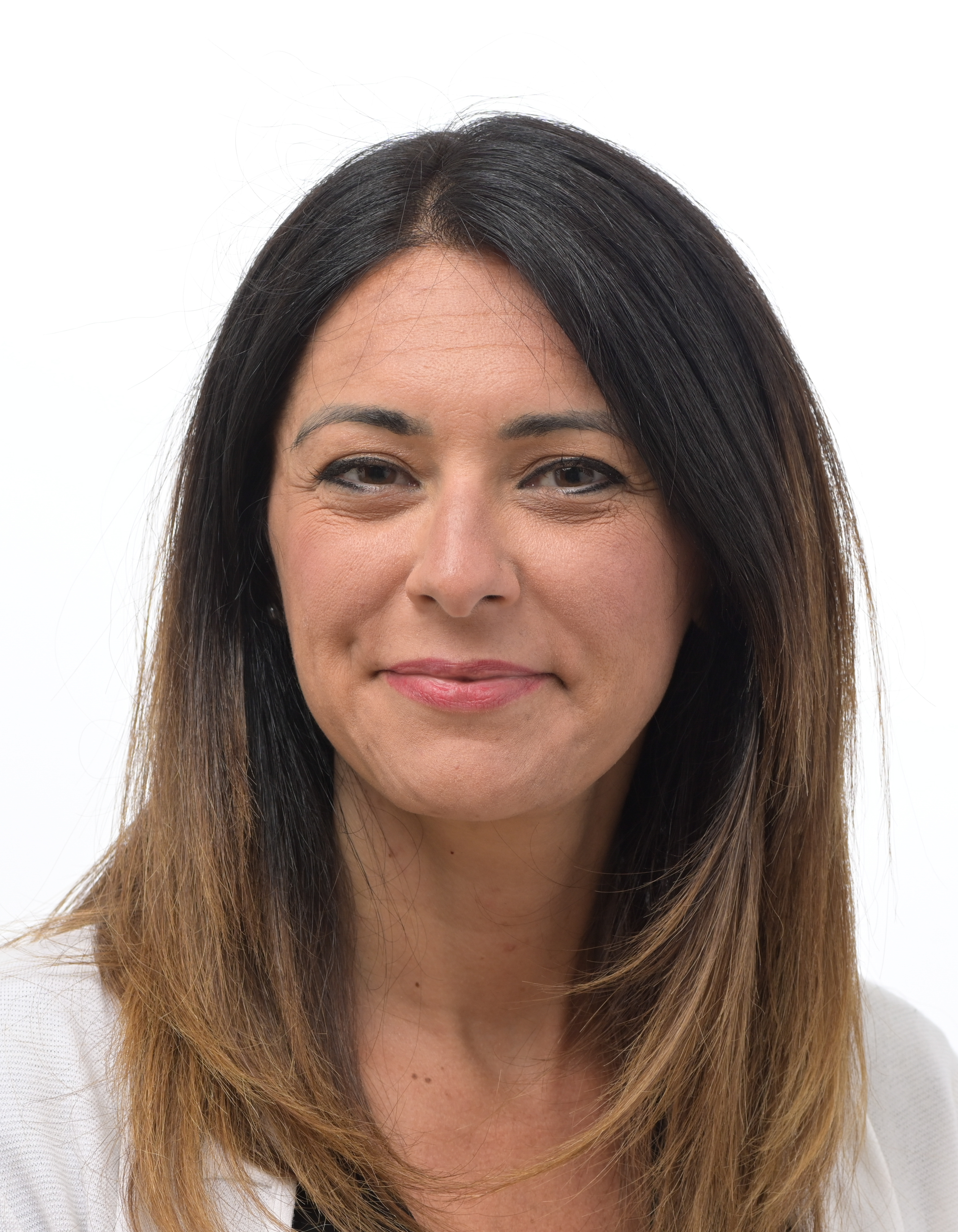
- Official portrait, 2024

Vice-President of the European Parliament
- Incumbent
- Assumed office 18 January 2022 Serving with See List
- President: Roberta Metsola

Member of the European Parliament for Italy
- Incumbent
- Assumed office 1 July 2014

Member of the Chamber of Deputies
- In office 29 April 2008 – 25 June 2014

Personal details
- Born: Giuseppina Picierno; 10 May 1981 (age 45) Santa Maria Capua Vetere, Italy
- Party: SP (since 2026)
- Other political affiliations: PPI (until 2002); DL (2002–2007); PD (2007–2026)
- Spouse: Massimiliano Coccia (m. 2023)
- Education: University of Salerno

Giuseppina "Pina" Picierno (Italian pronunciation: [ˈpiːna piˈtʃɛrno]; born 10 May 1981) is an Italian politician. Born in Santa Maria Capua Vetere, she was a member of the Democratic Party who has been serving in the European Parliament since 2014. Since 2022, she has served as vice-president of the European Parliament.

== Political career ==
=== Career in national politics ===
Picierno served two terms as a member of the Italian Parliament between 2008 and 2014.

=== Member of the European Parliament, 2014–present ===
Picierno was selected to head her party's regional list in the 2014 European elections. In parliament, she is a member of the Progressive Alliance of Socialists and Democrats group. She served on the Committee on Budgets from 2014 to 2017 and currently serves on the Committee on Women's Rights and Gender Equality. In addition to her committee assignments, she served as vice-chairwoman of the parliament's delegation to the EU-Mexico Joint Parliamentary Committee from 2014 to 2019.

Picierno was elected as Vice-President on 18 January 2022.

In June 2026, she left the centre-left Democratic Party because of its leader Elly Schlein's refusal to condemn supporters of dictator Vladimir Putin and the invasion of Ukraine, stating that "you cannot be ambiguous toward Putinist fascism and extremisms." She also criticized the party for its "movimentista" drift (that is, its rapprochement with the Five Star Movement's positions), and that "the home of the reformists no longer exists."

Shortly after, she joined the European Democratic Party and Renew Europe explaining that she was taking a stand against populists. In Italy, she launched the Public Space party.

==== Intergroup memberships ====
Picierno is also a member of the European Parliament Intergroup on Cancer, the European Parliament Intergroup on Fighting against Poverty, the European Parliament Intergroup on Integrity (Transparency, Anti-Corruption and Organized Crime) and of the European Parliament Intergroup on the Western Sahara.

== Recognition ==
In 2019, Picierno was the recipient of the Justice & Gender Equality Award at The Parliament Magazine's annual MEP Awards.

In 2022, she was the recipient of the IAI Award from the Istituto Affari Internazionali "for having firmly supported Ukraine's independence, territorial integrity, freedom and democracy since the beginning of the Russian invasion of Ukraine."

== Positions ==
In 2025, Picierno participated in a meeting with the Israel Defence and Security Forum (IDSF), an Israeli think tank supporting settlements in the West Bank. In response to criticism, Picierno stated that "isolating Israel means condemning an entire area to an eternal right-wing sovereigntism", receiving support from other Democratic Party members Filippo Sensi, Simona Malpezzi and Piero Fassino.

Picierno is a key supporter of Ukraine in its war against Russian aggression and has taken a lead role in combatting pro-Russia propaganda. This led to her being the target of repeated death threats and being placed under police protection. In 2026, she announced a hunger strike to bring awareness to the humanitarian crisis in Oleshky, which is occupied by Russian forces since 2022.

== Awards ==
- Order of Princess Olga, 3rd class (Ukraine, 2026)
