= Nikica Gabrić =

Croatian physician and politician

Nikica Gabrić (born 1961) is a Croatian physician and politician.

He was born in Metković. He graduated at the School of Medicine in Zagreb as an ophthalmologist. He founded the Special Hospital for Ophthalmology Svjetlost in Zagreb, in which he works and serves as the Director. He specializes in surgery of the anterior eye segment, with more than 30,000 operations done. His clinic is the third private health institution in Croatia in terms of total revenue, and boasts as the first one operating exclusively in the free market, without cooperation with the Croatian Institute for Health Insurance.

He is a professor at the Faculty of Medicine, University of Rijeka and a collaborative member of the Croatian Academy of Medical Sciences. In 1995 he founded the first Croatian eye bank LHOB. He is the acting President of the Croatian Society of Physicians in Cataract and Refractive Surgery. He authored more than 400 scientific papers and received numerous honors and awards, including the 2011 award for the most successful entrepreneur in the region of Southeast Europe. In the period 1987–1988 he was the President of the Youth of the Federal Republic of Croatia and in 1986–1990 a member of the Parliament of the Federal Public of Croatia. He also served as an adviser for health to the Deputy Prime Minister Željka Antunović.

He is the founder and former president of the association, think tank and a political party National Forum (Nacionalni forum), as well as leader of the national freemasonry organization.
