= Josipović =

Josipović is a Croatian surname, a patronymic derived from Josip (English equivalent Joseph). It may refer to the following notable people:

- Aleksandar Josipović (born 1981), French Serbian artist
- Alicia Dea Josipovic (born 1991), Canadian actress, dancer and singer
- Anton Josipović (born 1961), Bosnia and Herzegovina boxer
- Emerik Josipović (1834–1910), Croatian politician
- Gejza Josipović (1857–1934), Croatian politician
- Ivo Josipović (born 1957), President of Croatia, legal scholar and composer, husband of Tatjana Josipović
- Kosta Josipović (1887–1919), Serbian painter
- Renato Josipović (born 2001), Croatian footballer
- Tatjana Josipović (born 1962), Croatian jurist and professor, wife of Ivo Josipović
- Zoran Josipovic (born 1995), Swiss footballer

== See also ==
- Josifović, Serbian variant
- Jusufović, Bosniak variant
