= List of spouses of presidents and prime ministers of Croatia =

The current spouse of the President of Croatia is Sanja Musić Milanović.
The current spouse of the Prime Minister of Croatia is Ana Maslać Plenković.

== Spouses of presidents ==
(*) as spouse of the President of the Presidency of SR Croatia
(**) Spouses of Speakers of Parliament as Acting Presidents

#	Image	Name (Birth–Death)	Relation to President	Assumed position	Left position
1		Ankica Tuđman (née Žumbar) (24 July 1926 – 6 October 2022)	wife of Franjo Tuđman	30 May 1990*; 22 December 1990	10 December 1999
**		Neda Pavletić (née Majnarić) (22 June 1930 – 3 March 2017)	wife of Vlatko Pavletić	10 December 1999	2 February 2000
**		Slavica Tomčić (born 15 July 1953)	wife of Zlatko Tomčić	2 February 2000	18 February 2000
2		Milka Mesić (née Dudunić) (September 1939 – 22 October 2024)	wife of Stjepan Mesić	18 February 2000	18 February 2010
3		Tatjana Josipović (née Klepac) (born 14 May 1962)	wife of Ivo Josipović	19 February 2010	18 February 2015
4		Jakov Kitarović (born 4 October 1968)	husband of Kolinda Grabar-Kitarović	19 February 2015	18 February 2020
5		Sanja Musić Milanović (born 1969)	wife of Zoran Milanović	19 February 2020	Incumbent

== Spouses of prime ministers ==
(*) as spouse of the President of the Executive Council of SR Croatia

#	Name	Relation to Prime Minister
1	Milka Mesić (née Dudunić)*	wife of Prime Minister Stjepan Mesić
2	Marija Eker Manolić	wife of Prime Minister Josip Manolić
3	Jozefina Gregurić (née Abramović)	wife of Prime Minister Franjo Gregurić
4	Erika Šarinić	wife of Prime Minister Hrvoje Šarinić
5	Antonela Valentić	wife of Prime Minister Nikica Valentić
6	Sanja Gregurić-Mateša	wife of Prime Minister Zlatko Mateša
7	Dijana Pleština	wife of Prime Minister Ivica Račan
8	Mirjana Sanader (née Šarić)	wife of Prime Minister Ivo Sanader
–	Position vacant	Jadranka Kosor divorced before becoming Prime Minister
9	Sanja Musić Milanović	wife of Prime Minister Zoran Milanović
10	Sanja Dujmović Orešković	wife of Prime Minister Tihomir Orešković
11	Ana Maslać Plenković	wife of Prime Minister Andrej Plenković
