= Jakov Kitarović =

Croatian engineer and husband of Kolinda Grabar-Kitarović

First Gentleman of Croatia
- In role 19 February 2015 – 18 February 2020
- President: Kolinda Grabar-Kitarović
- Preceded by: Tatjana Josipović
- Succeeded by: Sanja Musić Milanović

Personal details
- Born: 4 October 1968 (age 57) Rijeka, SR Croatia, SFR Yugoslavia (modern Croatia)
- Spouse: Kolinda Grabar (m. 1996)
- Children: 2
- Education: University of Zagreb; University of Rijeka
- Website: Government website

Jakov Kitarović (born 4 October 1968) is a Croatian engineer. He is the spouse of Kolinda Grabar-Kitarović, the 4th President of Croatia from 2015 to 2020, who was elected to office in the January 2015 presidential election by defeating third president Ivo Josipović. Kitarović succeeded Tatjana Josipović as First Spouse and is the first man in the role, as well as the youngest to date, aged 46 at the time.

== Biography ==
Kitarović graduated from the Faculty of Electrical Engineering and Computing of the University of Zagreb in 1998 and also has a degree in nautical engineering from the Faculty of Maritime Studies of the University of Rijeka.

Kitarović married Kolinda Grabar-Kitarović in 1996, with whom he has two children. Following his wife's election to the presidency, he worked in a Zagreb-based software firm, Reversing Labs and later took up a position as a corporate security consultant in AD Plastik, the largest Croatian manufacturer of plastic parts for the car industry.
