= Sanja Musić Milanović =

Croatian scientist (born 1969)

First Lady of Croatia
- Incumbent
- Assumed office 19 February 2020
- President: Zoran Milanović
- Preceded by: Jakov Kitarović

Spouse of the Prime Minister of the Republic of Croatia
- In role 23 December 2011 – 22 January 2016
- President: Ivo Josipović; Kolinda Grabar-Kitarović
- Prime Minister: Zoran Milanović
- Preceded by: Position vacant
- Succeeded by: Sanja Dujmović Orešković

Personal details
- Born: Sanja Musić; 1969 (age 56–57) Zagreb, SR Croatia, SFR Yugoslavia (modern Croatia)
- Spouse: Zoran Milanović (m. 1994)
- Children: 2
- Parents: Ivan Musić; Ana Matić
- Education: University of Zagreb (School of Medicine)
- Website: Government website

Sanja Musić Milanović (born 1969) is a Croatian scientist and a professor at the Medical School of the University of Zagreb. She is the wife of Zoran Milanović, the fifth President of Croatia and former Prime Minister.

== Education and career ==
Musić Milanović graduated from the Medical School of the University of Zagreb, after which she attended the international postgraduate study programme Master in Public Health Methodology at the Université libre de Bruxelles, Faculté de Médecine, Ecole de Santé Publique where she earned the title of Master of Science. Musić Milanović earned a PhD in the Medical School of the University of Zagreb on the topic of demographic, behavioral, and socio-economic determinants of obesity in Croatian adults.

Musić Milanović is an assistant professor at the Department for Medical Statistics, Epidemiology and Medical Informatics on the Medical School of the University of Zagreb. Her areas of work are epidemiology and health promotion. Musić Milanović is Head of the Health Promotion Division on the Croatian Institute of Public Health which is the Reference Centre of the Ministry of Health for Health Promotion where she leads the implementation of the National Programme "Healthy Living".

As First Lady of Croatia, Musić Milanović plays a role in public life, supporting the President at official events and various initiatives particularly in the field of health and well-being. In September 2022, she announced that Croatia would host a Summit of First Ladies and Gentlemen in 2023 to address childhood obesity, in cooperation with the World Health Organization.

== Private life ==
Musić's father Ivan "Ive" Musić hails from Lišane Ostrovičke near Benkovac. His mother Ana Matić is a Herzegovinian Croat from Broćanac near Neum.

Musić met Zoran Milanović at a New Year's Eve party in 1991 and married him in 1994. They have two children.

In 2014, when Musić was a guest on the Croatian Radio show Izaberi zdravlje, she sparked controversy after she stated: "When it's said that brown bread that we recommend is more expensive than white bread, it initially is more expensive, but you can simply cut brown bread into thinner slices." The media later compared the statement to "Let them eat cake", calling Musić the Croatian Marie Antoinette.

In 2022, Musić sparked another controversy when the media discovered that she pressured teachers and the principal of the Classical Gymnasium in Zagreb, which her son attended, in order to increase her son's final grade at the end of the school year from 4 to 5 (with 5 being the highest grade).
