= Yosyp =

Yosyp is a Ukrainian masculine given name, cognate to Joseph.

Notable people with the name include:

- Yosyp Abramovych, birth name of Mikhail Mikhailik, Ukrainian politician
- Yosyp Bezpalko (1881–1950), Ukrainian politician and writer
- Yosyp Hirniak (1895–1989), Ukrainian-American theater actor and director
- Yosyp Pintus (born 1981), Ukrainian businessman
- Yosyp Vinsky (born 1956), Ukrainian politician

== See also ==
- Josip
- Josif
- Iosif
