= Iosif =

Iosif is a variant of the Biblical name Joseph found among the Romanians, Russians, Belarusians, Ukrainians, Georgians, and Armenians.

Notable people with the name include:

- Iosif Adamovich (1897–1937), Belarusian Soviet politician
- Iosif Amusin, Soviet historian
- Iosif Andriasov (1933–2000), Russian composer of Armenian descent
- Iosif Anisim, Romanian sprint canoer
- Iosif Ardeleanu, Romanian communist activist and bureaucrat
- Iosif Baratov (1872–1937), Georgian politician and lawyer
- Iosif Blaga, Romanian literary theorist and politician
- Iosif Bleikhman (1868–1921), Russian anarcho-communist
- Iosif Bobulescu, Romanian bishop
- Iosif Capotă, Romanian anti-communist resistance fighter
- Iosif Dubrovinsky (1877–1913), Russian revolutionary
- Iosif Vissarionovich Dzhugashvili, aka Joseph Stalin (1878–1953), Soviet dictator of the USSR
- Iosif Iacobici, Romanian general
- Iosif Iser, Romanian painter and graphic artist
- Iosif Kheifits (1905–1995), Soviet film director
- Iosif Kobzon (1937–2018), Russian singer of Ukrainian Jewish descent
- Iosif Kryvelev (1906-1991), Soviet scholar of religion
- Iosif Mendelssohn, Romanian chess master
- Iosif Abgarovich Orbeli (1887–1961), Armenian medieval historian
- Iosif Pogrebyssky, Ukrainian chess master
- Iosif Rotariu, Romanian footballer
- Iosif Shklovsky, Soviet astronomer and astrophysicist
- Iosif Staneŭski (born 1969), Belarusian Roman Catholic Archbishop
- Iosif Szakács (1934–2026), Romanian footballer
- Iosif Vigu, Romanian footballer and manager
- Iosif Vitebskiy, Soviet Ukrainian Olympic medalist and world champion fencer and fencing coach
- Iosif Vulcan, Austro-Hungarian Romanian magazine editor and cultural figure
- Dan Iosif, Romanian politician
- Ștefan Octavian Iosif, Romanian poet

== See also ==
- Iosif, a village in Liebling Commune, Timiș County, Romania
- Josif
- Yosyp
