= Josifović =

Josifović (Serbian Cyrillic: Јосифовић) is a Serbian surname, a patronymic derived from given name Josif (English equivalent Joseph). It may refer to:

- Đurđe Josifović (1868–1941), Serbian brigadier general of the Royal Yugoslav Army
- Mihailo "Mikajle" Josifović (died 1941), guerrilla, member of Serbian Chetnik Organization
- Stanislav Josifović, politician in the Serbian puppet Commissioner Government
- Emilijan Josifović, Serbian Orthodox priest, signatory of Vukovar resolution
- Antonije Josifovic

== See also ==
- Josipović, Croatian variant
- Josifovski, Macedonian variant
