= Josif =

Josif (Serbian: Јосиф) is a masculine given name, a cognate of Joseph. It may refer to:

- Josif Chirila (born 1983), Romanian sprint canoeist who has competed since 2004
- Josif Dorfman (born 1952), Ukrainian-French chess Grandmaster, coach, and chess writer
- Josif Marinković (1851–1931), Serbian composer of the nineteenth century
- Josif Pančić (1814–1888), Serbian botanist
- Josif Rajačić (1785–1861), metropolitan of Sremski Karlovci, Serbian patriarch, administrator of Serbian Vojvodina, baron
- Josif Runjanin (1821–1878), Croatian composer of Serbian ethnicity, composed the melody of the Croatian national anthem
- Josif Shtokalo (1897–1987), Ukrainian mathematician

== See also ==
- Iosif
- Josip
- Joseph (disambiguation)
- Josifović, Serbian surname
