= Forward Croatia – Progressive Alliance =

Forward Croatia Progressive Alliance Naprijed Hrvatska Progresivni savez
- President: Ivo Josipović
- Founded: 31 May 2015
- Dissolved: 11 April 2019
- Split from: Social Democratic Party
- Merged into: Social Democratic Party
- Headquarters: Zagreb, Croatia
- Ideology: Social democracy Progressivism
- Political position: Centre-left
- National affiliation: Successful Croatia
- Colors: Red

Website
- naprijedhrvatska.hr

Forward Croatia – Progressive Alliance (Croatian: Naprijed Hrvatska – Progresivni savez) was a centre-left political party founded by former Croatian President Ivo Josipović.

== History ==
Party's founding congress was held on 31 May 2015 in Zagreb.

Some of the most prominent party members were a professor at Zagreb Faculty of Law Josip Kregar, professor at the Zagreb Faculty of Economics Velimir Srića, opera singer Dunja Vejzović, film and TV director Irena Škorić, attorney Anto Nobilo, and former Minister of Veterans Ivica Pančić.

Ahead of 2015 parliamentary elections the party formed a coalition called Successful Croatia with liberal People's Party - Reformists.

On 11 April 2019, the party joined into the SDP.

== Electoral history ==
Election	In coalition with	Votes won (coalition totals)	Percentage	Seats won	Change
2015	NS-R-DDS-HSU-U-ZF	34,573	1.54%	0 / 151	Steady
