= Ana Maslać Plenković =

Croatian jurist

Spouse of the Prime Minister of the Republic of Croatia
- Incumbent
- In role 19 October 2016
- President: Kolinda Grabar-Kitarović; Zoran Milanović
- Prime Minister: Andrej Plenković
- Preceded by: Sanja Dujmović Orešković

Personal details
- Born: Ana Maslać; 19 December 1979 (age 46) Dubrovnik, SR Croatia, SFR Yugoslavia
- Spouse: Andrej Plenković (m. 2014)
- Children: 3

Ana Maslać Plenković (born 19 December 1979) is a Croatian jurist, the wife of Croatian politician and Prime Minister Andrej Plenković. She was the Head of the Human Resources and Legal Service of the Croatian Parliament.

== Personal life ==
Ana Maslać was born in Dubrovnik and is of Herzegovinian descent. In 2014, she married Andrej Plenković, then an MEP. The couple have three children: Mario (b. 2014), Mila (b. 2017) and Ivan (b. 2022).
