= Milka Mesić =

Croatian presidential consort (1939–2024)

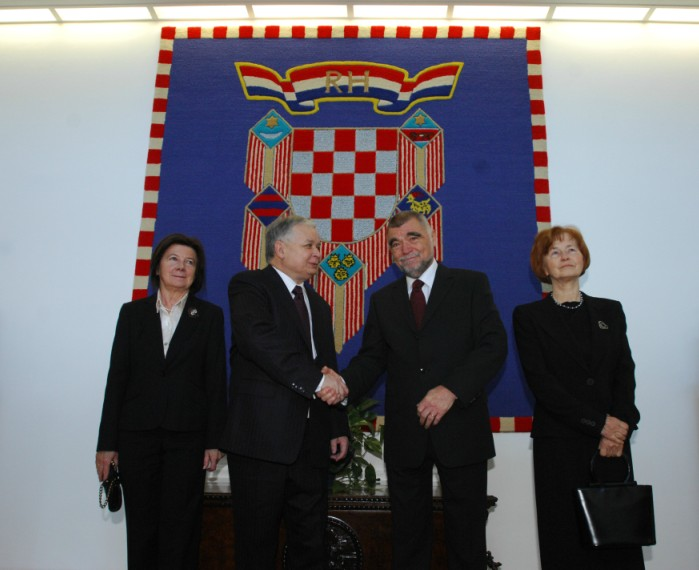
- Mesić (far right) and president Stjepan Mesić hosting Polish president Lech Kaczyński and his wife Maria at the Presidential Palace in Zagreb

First Lady of Croatia
- In role 18 February 2000 – 18 February 2010
- President: Stjepan Mesić
- Preceded by: Slavica Tomčić (Acting); Ankica Tuđman
- Succeeded by: Tatjana Josipović

Spouse of the President of the Presidency of Yugoslavia
- In role 30 June 1991 – 5 December 1991
- President: Stjepan Mesić
- Prime Minister: Ante Marković

Spouse of the President of the Executive Council of SR Croatia
- In role 30 May 1990 – 24 August 1990
- President: Franjo Tuđman
- Prime Minister: Stjepan Mesić
- Succeeded by: Marija Eker Manolić

Personal details
- Born: Milka Dudunić; September 1939 Slabinja, Banovina of Croatia, Kingdom of Yugoslavia (modern Croatia)
- Died: 22 October 2024 (aged 85) Zagreb, Croatia
- Spouse: Stjepan Mesić (m. 1961)
- Children: 2

Milka Mesić (née Dudunić; September 1939 – 22 October 2024) was a Croatian socialite who was the wife of Stjepan Mesić, the former president of Croatia (2000–2010), Speaker of the Croatian Parliament (1992–1994), President of the Presidency of Yugoslavia (1991), President of the Executive Council of SR Croatia (1990) and Mayor of Orahovica.

== Biography ==
Milka Dudunić was born in September 1939 in Slabinja, Kingdom of Yugoslavia (now Croatia), near the modern-day border of Croatia and Bosnia and Herzegovina.

She met her future husband, Stjepan Mesić, after he had seen her in the jury of a dance competition in Zagreb and had asked his friend to introduce him to her because his friend's girlfriend was Milka's college roommate. The couple married in 1961 after Stjepan had earned a college degree and their first daughter, Saša, was born soon afterwards. Milka had been studying psychology at the University of Zagreb, but abandoned her studies after the birth of her first daughter and her husband's graduation. The couple moved from Zagreb to Stjepan's native town of Orahovica and Milka gave birth to their second daughter Dunja in 1963.

In 1965, Stjepan Mesić became the first popularly elected Member of the Croatian Parliament and thereafter proceeded to become the chairman of the Municipal Assembly of Orahovica and later the municipality's president. Stjepan also gained employment as an assistant to the director of the local community health center in order to provide an income for his wife and daughters. However, following the outbreak of the Croatian Spring and the resulting crackdown by the regime of Yugoslav president Josip Broz Tito on political opponents, Stjepan Mesić was stripped of his political functions and his job. He refused to immigrate abroad, as many other Croatian Spring supporters at the time had done to avoid further misfortune at the hands of the Yugoslav regime, and instead chose to agree to a trial and was sentenced to a two-year jail term. The Mesić family sued the community health center in Orahovica and the monetary compensation awarded to the family was used to send Milka and her two daughters to Zagreb, where they resided with Stjepan's stopmother Mileva. Milka was able to gain employment at a kindergarten at the mjesna zajednica (a form of local self-government in the former Yugoslavia) of Studentski dom, but she almost lost her job when it was found out that her husband was in prison for activities relating to the Croatian Spring and ultimately retained her job due to the efforts of her colleagues, who shielded her from being branded as holding responsibility for her husband's activities. She later worked at a kindergarten in the Pantovčak neighborhood of Zagreb until she went into retirement.

After her husband's election as President of Croatia in 2000 she kept a low profile and seldom accompanied him on official trips and state visits abroad. However, she came to public attention in 2010, when it was revealed that she had acquired two apartments in Zagreb (along with the one already owned by the Mesić family) which were together valued at approximately 1.9 million kuna, having purchased them from a company owned by Stjepan Mesić's former presidential campaign manager Štefanija Balog. President Mesić proceeded to explain that the money used to purchase the two apartments was loaned from a friend of theirs, whom he refused to name, and that the money would be paid back when the Mesić family sold its valuable apartment on Ilica street. Several affairs also surfaced later on involving the couple's daughters, Saša and Dunja, as well as their grandchildren Sara Šimunović and Tomo Mesić Obranović. She died on 22 October 2024 at the age of 85.

== Personal life and death ==
In 1961, she married future Croatian president Stjepan Mesić, who also held a number of other high-ranking political offices in Yugoslavia and Croatia, as well as local-level political offices and a judgeship in his home town of Orahovica. They had two daughters: Saša (born 1961) and Dunja (born 1963).

On 22 October 2024, it was announced that Mesić had died at the age of 85.
