= Oles Honchar Dnipro National University =

Public university in Dnipro, Ukraine

Coordinates: 48.435°N 35.036°E

- Дніпровський національний університет імені Олеся Гончара
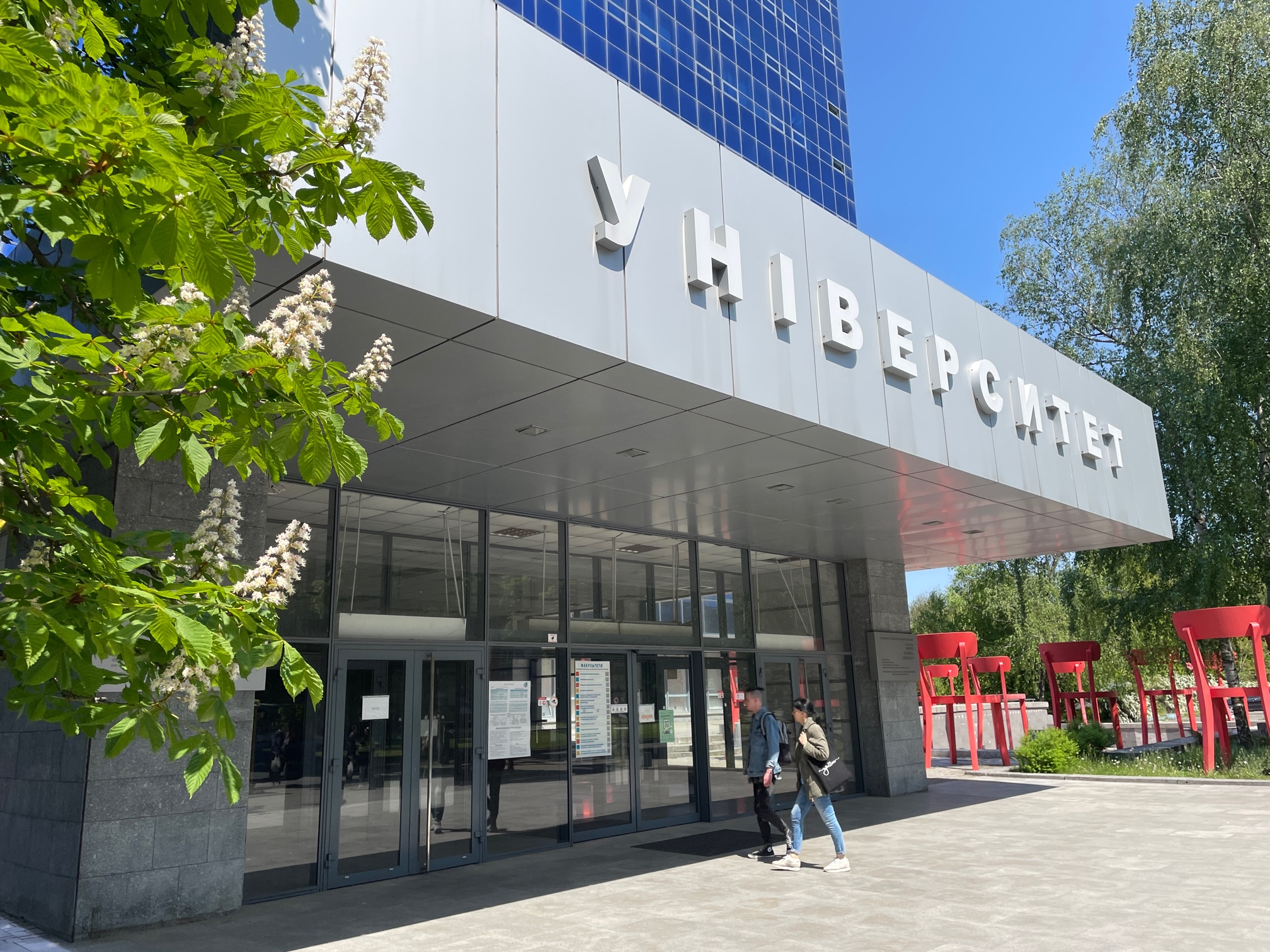
- Motto: Docendo discimus
- Type: public university
- Established: 1918
- Affiliations: Ministry of Education and Science of Ukraine
- Academic affiliations: IAU
- Rector: Sergiy Okovytyy
- Students: 20,000
- Location: Dnipro, Ukraine
- Website: dnu.dp.ua
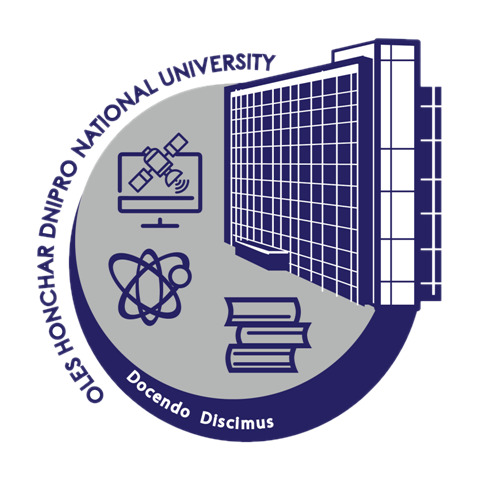

University rankings

Regional – Overall
- QS Emerging Europe and Central Asia: 211-220 (2022)

The Oles Honchar Dnipro National University (abbr. DNU, Ukrainian: Дніпровський національний університет імені Олеся Гончара, ДНУ, romanized: Dniprovskyi natsionalnyi universytet imeni Olesia Honchara) is a state-sponsored university located in Dnipro, Ukraine. It was founded in 1918. The first four faculties were History and Linguistics, Law, Medicine, and Physics and Mathematics.

Nowadays, DNU, as a large classical university, includes 14 faculties in formal, natural and social sciences. 730 academics provide learning for about 10,700 students (including 130 international students from nearly 30 countries). The university offers 98 programs for obtaining bachelor's and master's degrees and performs training for PhD-students in 35 fields. Second higher education can also be obtained at DNU.

Before Russian aggression in the East of Ukraine in 2014, the university had 20 faculties with 1,300 academics. The number of students came to about 22,000 (with 3,000 international students among them). Oles Honchar Dnipro National University has close ties with one of the world's largest rocket and space centres – Yuzhnoye SDO Yuzhnoye Design Bureau, as well as with other industrial and scientific organisations of the Donetsk-Prydniprovsk region populated by more than 15 million people.

According to its strategy of internalization, DNU actively establishes scientific and academic links with other institutions all over the world. Currently, 93 bilateral agreements with HEIs and research centres from Europe, Asia, the US and Canada run at the university. Based on the wide range of foreign bilateral partnerships, DNU lecturers and researchers closely collaborate with their international colleagues; in turn, the university students are taught within credit or dual degree exchange programmes. Besides, students and staff of the university regularly participate in various global mobility programmes such as the Erasmus+ Mobility Programme (EU), Mitacs (Canada), Global UGRAD (the USA), DAAD programmes (Germany), etc.

DNU implements international educational and research projects. For example, since 1993, DNU has won 14 TEMPUS projects, two Jean Monnet Modules and two Erasmus+ Capacity Building for Higher Education projects. The University Scientific Library has 2,600,000 volumes, including rare and unique editions. DNU has built strong scientific schools of thought in Mathematics, Mechanics, Radiophysics and Electronics, Rocketry, Neurocybernetic, Biotechnology, Organic Chemistry, History of Ukraine, Historiography and History of Ukraine, Archaeology, German, Literature and Linguistics.

== History ==
Katerynoslav University (now Oles Honchar Dnipro National University) was founded in the Ukrainian State of Pavlo Skoropadsky in 1918. In 1920 the university was transformed into Katerynoslav (later in Dnipropetrovsk) Institute of Education, which operated until 1933. In 1933, Dnipropetrovsk State University was restored, however, the revival of the university coincided with the intensification of Stalin's totalitarian regime, which led to mass arrests and irreparable losses of personnel. During World War II some members of the faculty and students went to defend their homeland from the Nazi invaders; others worked in evacuation.

In September 2000, Dnipropetrovsk State University acquired the status of a national institution.

The city of Dnipropetrovsk was renamed Dnipro in May 2016 as part of the decommunization laws enacted a year earlier.

== Structure ==
The university comprises 14 faculties, 46 research laboratories, three research institutes and four colleges.

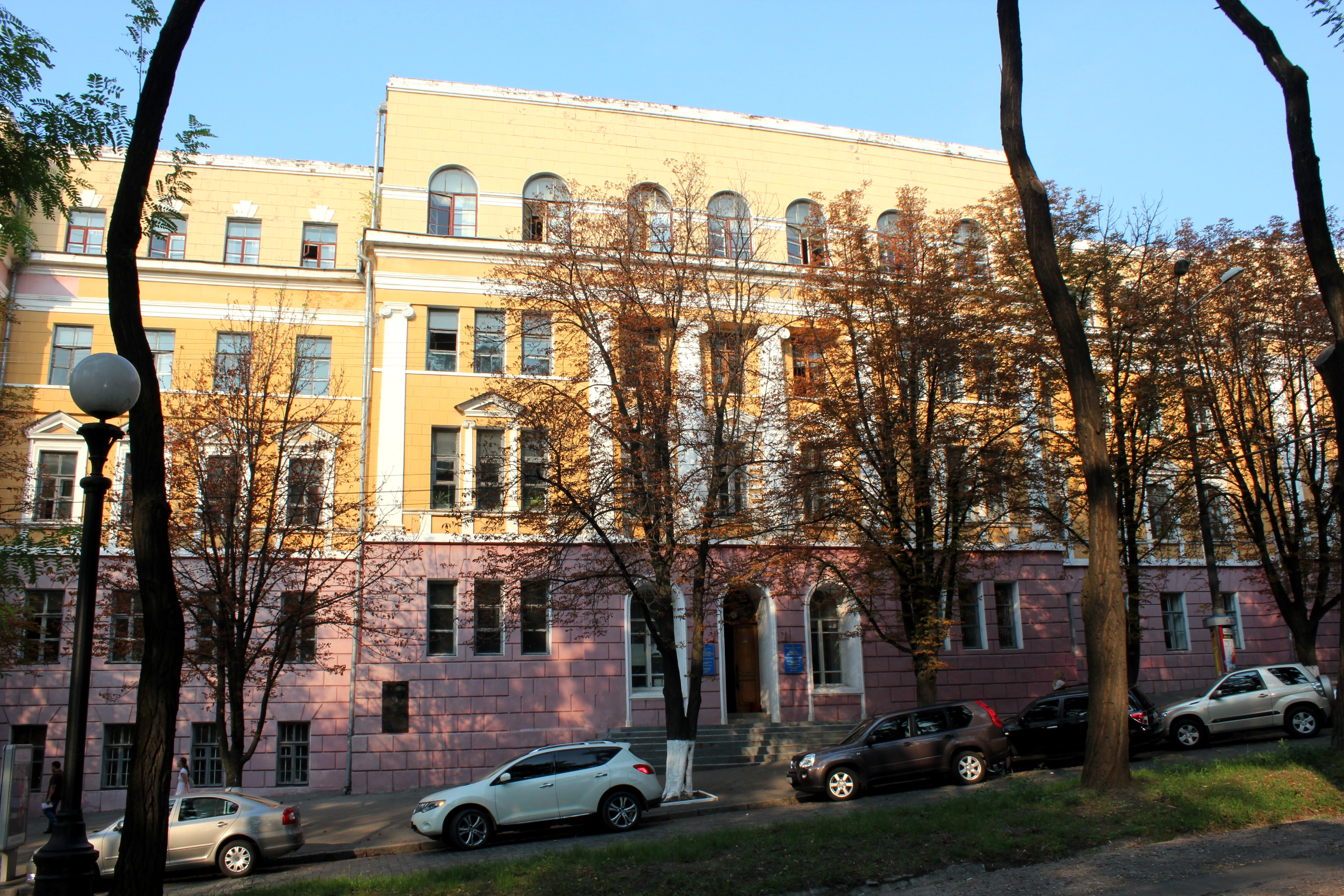
Old university building

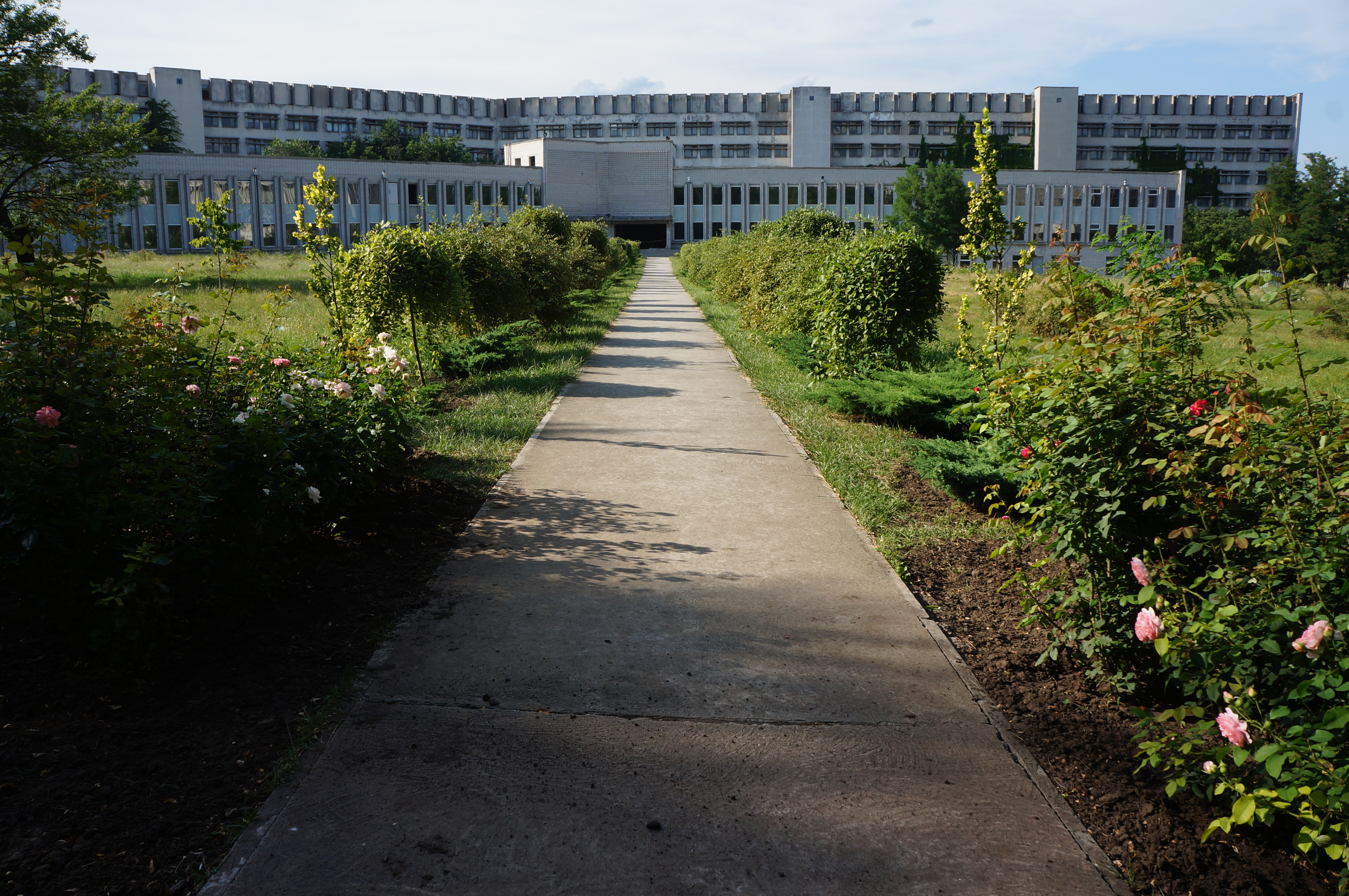
DNU campus

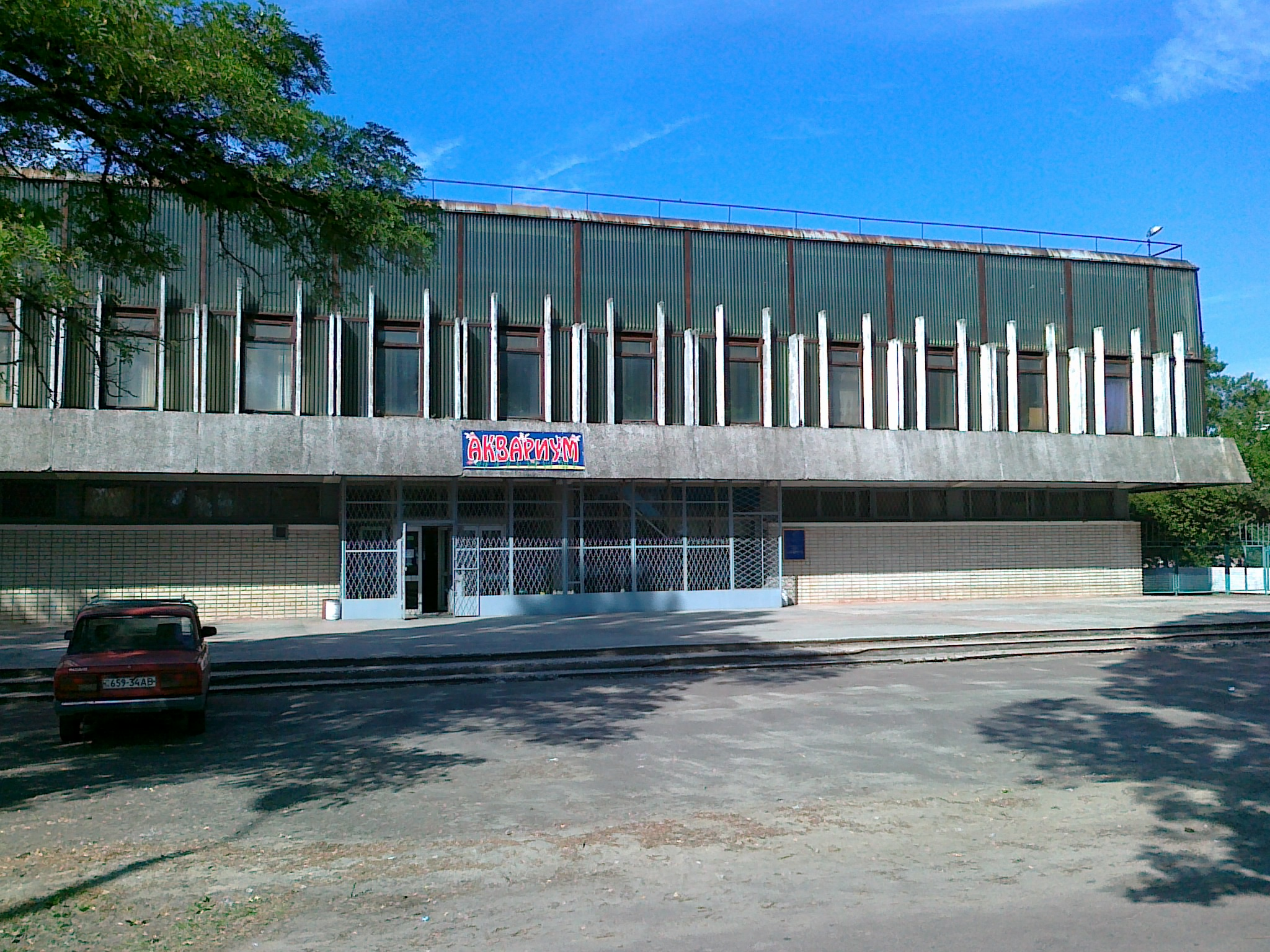
University aquarium

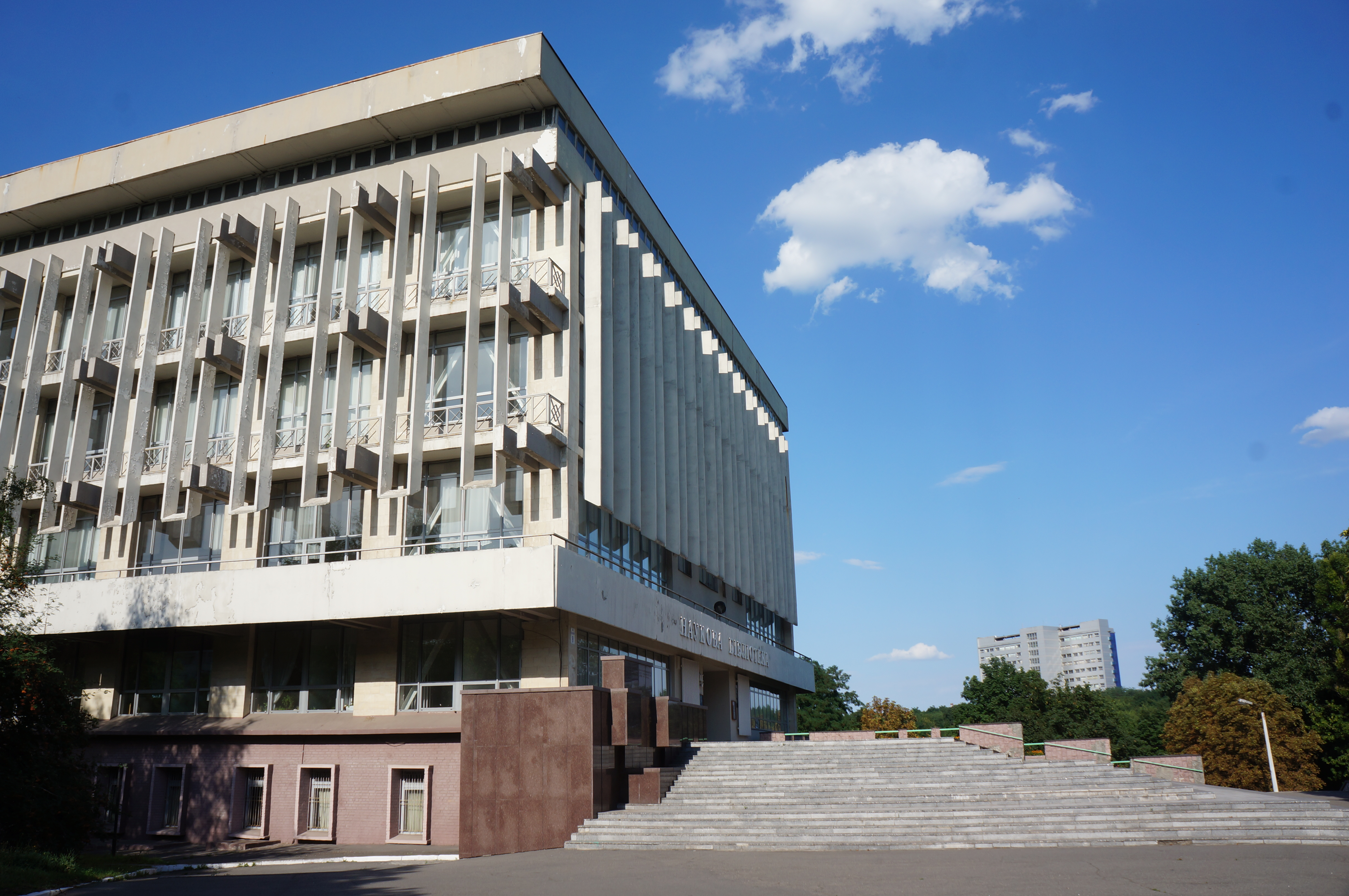
University library with main building in the background

The list of DNU faculties is as follows:

• Faculty of Ukrainian and Foreign Philology and Study of Arts

• Faculty of Social Sciences and International Relations

• Faculty of History

• Faculty of Psychology and Special Education

• Faculty of Applied Mathematics

• Faculty of Law

• Faculty of Physics, Electronics and Computer Systems

• Faculty of Economics

• Faculty of Systems and Means of Mass Communication

• Physical and Technical Faculty

• Faculty of Mechanics and Mathematics

• Faculty of Chemistry

• Faculty of Biology and Ecology

• Faculty of Medical Technologies of Diagnostics and Rehabilitation

Also, there are three research units: • Research Institute of Biology

• Research Institute of Chemistry and Geology

• Research Institute of Energy Efficient Technologies and Materials Science

Besides, DNU has the following scientific and cultural facilities:

• Educational and Research Biological Station

• Belgard International Biosphere Station

• The Aquarium Research Complex

• Botanical Garden

• Zoological Museum

• Scientific Library

• Palace of Sports

• Culture Palace for Students

Additional educational opportunities are offered by:

• Centre for Intensive Language Learning

• Educational and Methodological Centre of Distance and Evening Forms of Education

• Educational and Methodological Centre of Postgraduate Education and Skills Development

Four colleges included in the institutional structure are listed below:

• Mechanical Engineering Vocational College

• Vocational College of Rocket and Space Engineering

• Zhovti Vody Industrial Specialist College

• Specialist College of Economics and Business

== Student life ==
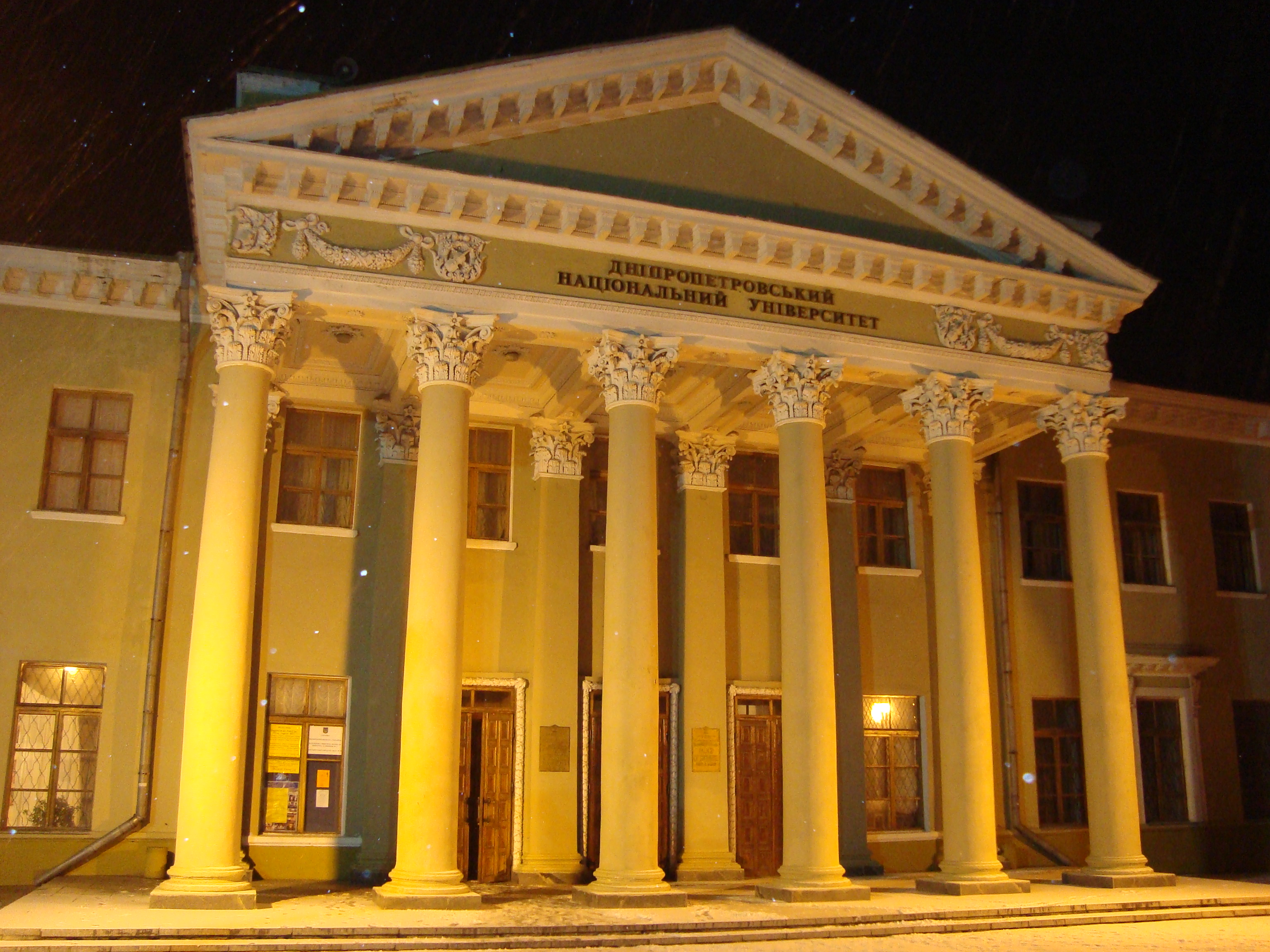
Palace of Students

The DNU Student Body plays an important role in student life. The main tasks of the Body are to protect student rights and improve student life. Besides, the Body significantly contributes to youth culture development and adaptation of international students by arranging speaking clubs, song, dance and beauty contests, sports events, inviting famous Ukrainian poets and writers, etc.

== Awards and reputation ==
DNU has been ranking among Ukrainian universities:

• First in SCImago Institutions Rankings 2021 in two categories:

1. Business, Management and Accounting

2. Social Sciences

• Eleventh in QS World University Rankings: EECA Region 2022

• Fourth position in Times Higher Education Impact Rankings 2023

• Fourth position in THE World University Rankings 2023

According to AcademicInfluence.com, DNU is among the TOP-300 global universities in mathematics education.

== Affiliations and memberships ==
DNU is a member of the following international university consortiums:

• Agence universitaire de la Francophonie (AUF)

• Eastern Partnership University Cluster (EaPUC)

• European University Foundation (EUF)

• Magna Charta Universitatum Observatory (MCUO)

== International contacts ==
The closest partnerships in the educational and research fields DNU perform with the following institutions:

Bilateral academic and research exchanges:

• Vilnius University (Lithuania)

• University of Latvia (Latvia)

• University of Wrocław (Poland)

• University of Lodz (Poland)

• Pavol Jozef Šafárik University (Slovakia)

• Lund University (Sweden)

• Jackson State University (USA)

Erasmus+ Mobility Programme:

• University of Cordoba (Spain)

• Université Paris-Saclay (France)

• Sapienza University of Rome (Italy)

• Bordeaux Montaigne University (France)

• Aristotle University of Thessaloniki (Greece)

Dual Degree programmes:

• Le Mans University (France)

• Mittweida University of Applied Sciences (Germany)

• Pedagogical University of Krakow (Poland)

== List of specialties ==
- Jurisprudence
- Accounting and Auditing
- International Economic Relations
- Management of Foreign-economic Activity
- International Relations
- Finances
- Banking
- Enterprise Economy
- Personnel management and labor economics
- International economics
- Marketing
- Russian Language and Literature
- Translation (English Language and Literature)
- Laboratory Diagnostics
- Language and Literature (English)
- Language and Literature (German)
- Language and Literature (French)
- Language and Literature (Chinese)
- Language and Literature (Japanese)
- Translation (German Language and Literature)
- Translation (French Language and Literature)
- Journalism
- Psychology
- Ukrainian Language and Literature
- Economic Cybernetics
- Social Work
- Sociology
- Computing
- Biology
- Biochemistry
- Zoology
- Botany
- Microbiology and virology
- Ecology and environmental protection
- Archaeology
- Physiology
- Design
- Political Science
- Publishing and Editing
- Economic Statistics
- Automated System Programming
- Intellectual Systems for Making Decisions
- Computer Systems and Networks
- Information Control Systems and Technologies
- Food Technologies
- Geography
- Fine and Crafts Arts
- Philosophy
- Radioelectronic Devices, Systems and Technologies
- History
- Defectology
- Automatics and Management in Technical Systems
- Apparatus of Radio Connection, Radio Broadcasting and Television
- Archives Studies
- Applied Physics
- Microelectronics and Semi-conductive Devices
- Biotechnical and Medical Apparatus and Systems
- Physics of Solids
- Radiophysics and Electronics
- Technologies and Means of Telecommunications
- Chemistry
- Chemical Technology of High Molecular Compounds
- Applied Mathematics
- Mathematics

== Notable alumni ==
- Natalia Boytsun, economist and scientist
- Oles Honchar, a prominent Ukrainian writer, member of the Academy of Sciences of Ukraine, laureate of Lenin Prize and the State Prize of Ukraine, Hero of Socialist Labor
- Volodymyr Horbulin, honorary member of the Presidium of the National Academy of Sciences of Ukraine, Doctor of Technical Sciences, professor
- Leonid Kuchma, President of Ukraine (1994-2005), laureate of Lenin Prize and the State Prize of Ukraine
- Volodymyr Lytvyn, Chairman of the Verkhovna Rada of Ukraine (2002-2006, 2010-2012), member of Academy of Sciences of Ukraine, laureate of the State Prize of Ukraine
- Serhii Plokhy, historian
- Lyubov Sirota, poet
- Petro Tronko, head of the Institute of History of Ukraine, member of National Academy of Sciences of Ukraine, laureate of the State Prize of Ukraine
- Yulia Tymoshenko, Former Prime Minister of Ukraine (2005, 2007-2010)
- Horpyna Vatchenko, museum director and historian
- Pavlo Zahrebelnyi, novelist
- Mykhailo Zghurovskyi, Rector of the National Technical University of Ukraine "KPI"
- Svetlana Zaginaichenko, physicist
- Josif Shtokalo, mathematician

== Awards and reputation ==
Dnipro National University took eighth place in the integrated ranking universities of Ukraine. According to KP, the most authoritative rankings that are referenced by experts and journalists, are national rankings UNESCO "Top-200 Ukraine", "Compass" and the international rating "Vebometryks."

== See also ==
- List of modern universities in Europe (1801–1945)
