= Josip =

Josip (pronounced [jǒsip]) is a male given name largely found among Croats and sometimes Slovenes, a cognate of Joseph.

In Croatia, the name Josip was the second most common masculine given name in the decades up to 1959, and has stayed among the top ten most common ones throughout 2011.

Notable people named Josip include:

- Ruđer Josip Bošković (1711–1787), Ragusan physicist
- Josip Bozanić (born 1949), Croatian cardinal
- Josip Broz Tito (1892–1980), Yugoslav president
- Josip Frank (1844–1911), Croatian politician
- Josip Globevnik (born 1945), Slovenian mathematician
- Josip Golubar (born 1985), Croatian footballer
- Josip Hatze (1879–1959), Croatian composer
- Josip Jelačić (1801–1859), Croatian ban
- Josip Katalinski (1948–2011), Bosnian footballer
- Josip Kozarac (1858–1906), Croatian writer
- Josip Lukačević (1983–2025), Bosnian professional footballer
- Josip Manolić (1920–2024), Croatian politician
- Josip Marohnić (1866–1921), Croatian emigrant activist
- Josip Pejaković (1948–2025), Bosnian actor and writer
- Josip Plemelj (1873–1967), Slovenian mathematician
- Josip Projić (born 1987), Serbian footballer
- Josip Račić (1885–1908), Croatian painter
- Josip Skoblar (born 1941), Croatian former player and football manager
- Josip Skoko (born 1975), Australian soccer player
- Josip Juraj Strossmayer (1815–1905), Croatian bishop and politician
- Josip Šimunić (born 1978), Croatian footballer
- Josip Štolcer-Slavenski (1896–1955), Croatian composer
- Josip Vranković (born 1968), Croatian basketball coach

== See also ==
- Yosyp
- Josif
- Josef (given name)
- Jozef
- Josipović
