= Svetlana Zaginaichenko =

Ukrainian solid state physicist

Svetlana Yurievna Zaginaichenko
- Загинайченко Світлана Юріївна
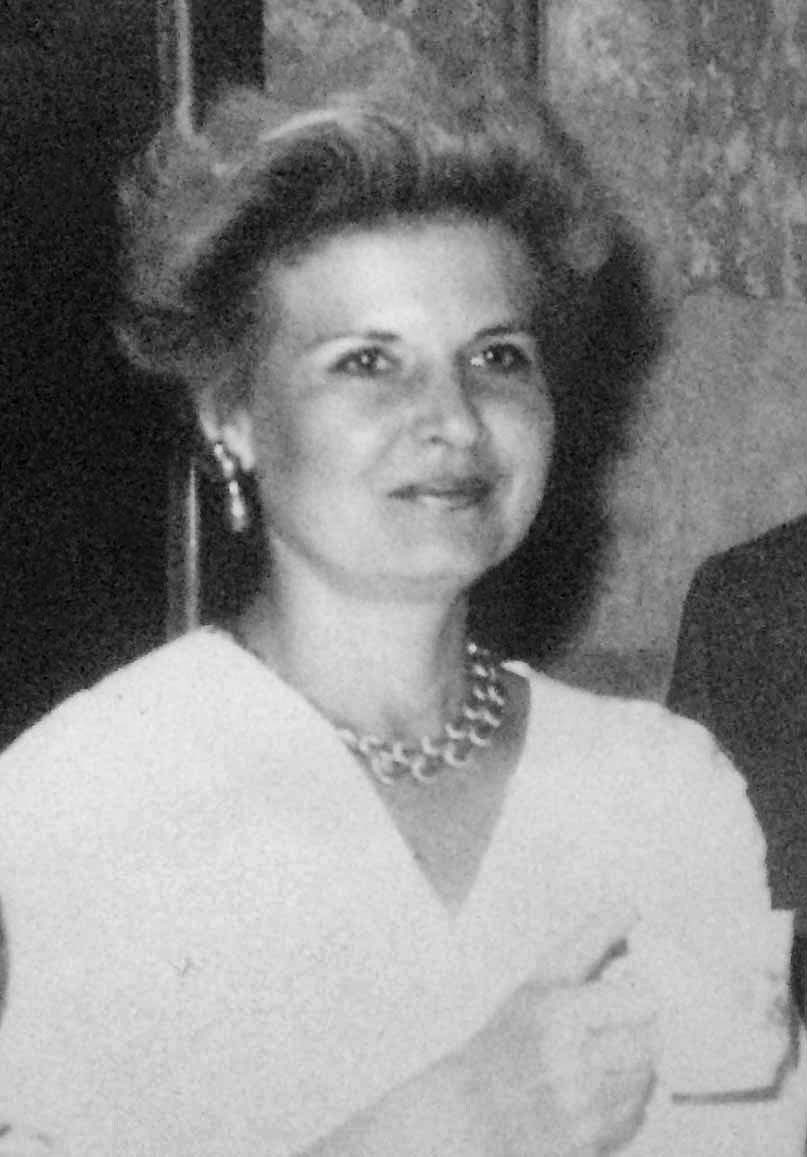
- Born: Svetlana Yurievna Zaginaichenko; 10 August 1957; Kyiv, Ukrainian Soviet Socialist Republic, Soviet Union
- Died: 23 November 2015 (aged 58); Dnipro, Ukraine
- Education: Oles Honchar Dnipro National University, National Metallurgical Academy of Ukraine
- Known for: Carbon materials, hydrogen energy
- Mother: Zinaida Alfredivna Matysina
- Scientific career
- Workplaces: Department No. 67 Materials hydrogen and carbon nanostructures, National Academy of Sciences of Ukraine, Kurdyumov Institute of Metal Physics
- Thesis: Solubility, magnetism and redistribution of atoms of alloys of hexagonal ordering structures (1984)
- Doctoral advisor: G.M. Vorobiev

Svetlana Yurievna Zaginaichenko (Ukrainian: Світлана Юріївна Загінайченко, Russian: Светлана Юрьевна Загинайченко; 10 August 1957 - 23 November 2015) was a Ukrainian solid state physicist. She studied the physical properties of carbon materials and their application to hydrogen energy storage. She was a nominee for the 2016 Nobel Prize in Chemistry for her work in studying fullerenes.

== Education ==
Zaginaichenko earned a physics degree with honors from Oles Honchar Dnipro National University in 1979.

In 1984, Zaginaichenko defended her dissertation on the physical properties of hexagonally-structured and interstitial alloys at Dnipro Metallurgical Institute, earning the degree of Candidate of Physical and Mathematical Sciences (which is the Soviet equivalent of a Doctor of Philosophy). Her thesis focused on hexagonal close-packed structures and developed theories for impurity solubility, interstitial atom kinetics, and magnetism of such alloys.

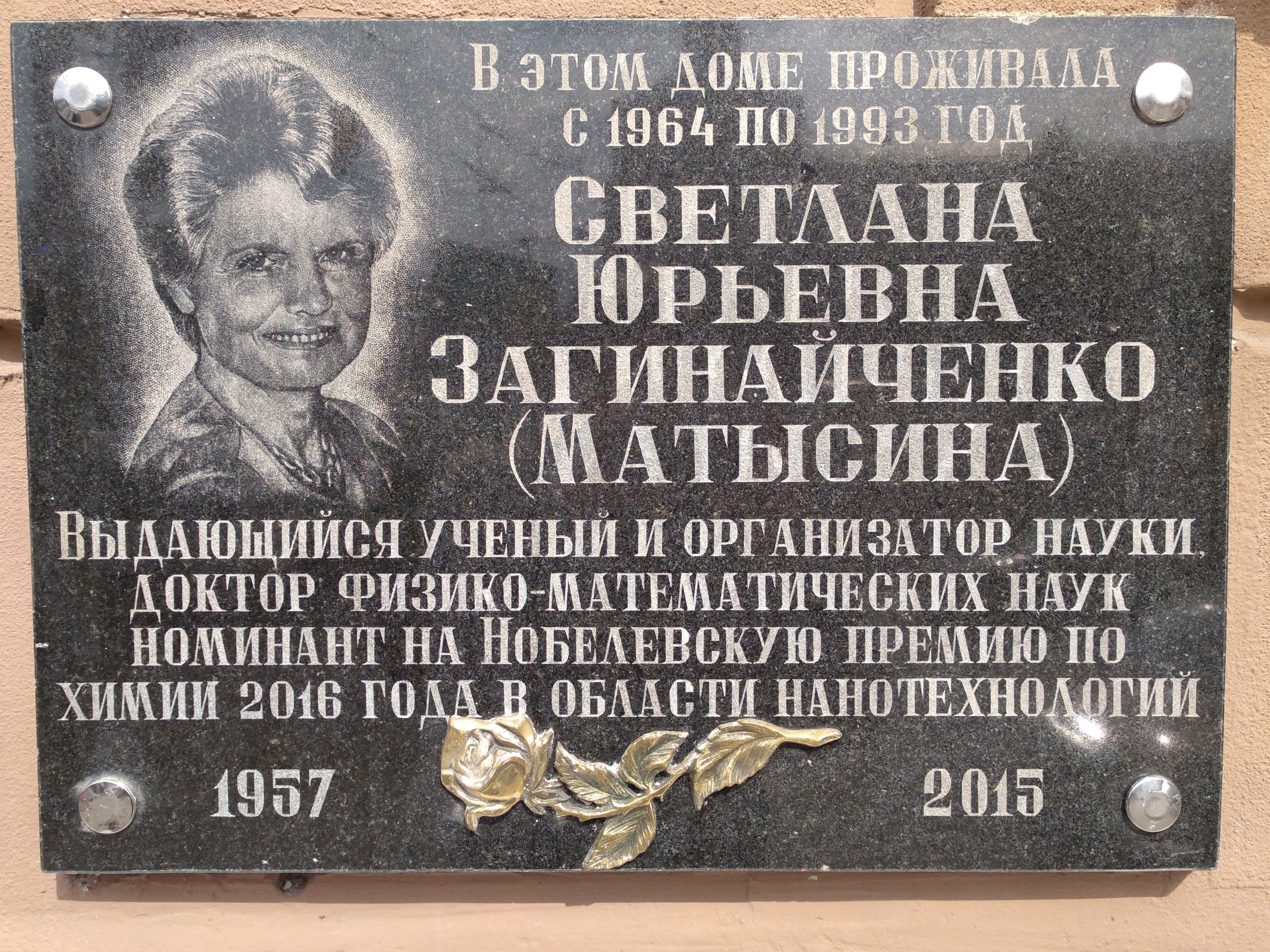
A memorial plaque commemorating Zaginaichenko's life, located on the house in Dnipro where she grew up.

== Career ==
From 4 November 1995 until her death in 2015, Zaginaichenko was a leading researcher at the Department for Hydrogen Materials and Carbon Nanostructures at the Institute for Problems of Materials Sciences at the National Academy of Sciences of Ukraine. She was one of the founding members of the Association of Hydrogen Energy in Ukraine (AHEU), which was formed with the support of Turhan Nejat Veziroglu, the president of the International Association of Hydrogen Energy. She was also part of the organizing committee for the International Conference of Carbon Nanomaterials in Clean Energy Hydrogen Systems.

She was nominated for the 2016 Nobel Prize in Chemistry for her work in studying the physical structure of fullerenes and proving that they have three main configurations (isomers). However, she died before the 2016 announcement of the prize, so even if the prize committee had chosen to honor this contribution, the prize's rules against posthumous awards would have prevented her from winning it.

== Awards ==
- Yangel Award, State Space Agency of Ukraine and the Federation of Cosmonautics of Ukraine - October 1994
- Kondratyuk Medal, State Space Agency of Ukraine and the Federation of Cosmonautics of Ukraine - 23 December 1995

== See also ==
- Fullerene
- Hydrogen fuel
- Turhan Nejat Veziroğlu
