= Josif Shtokalo =

Ukrainian mathematician (1897–1987)

- Йосип Захарович Штокало
- Born: November 16, 1897; Skomorokhy, Sokal, Galicia
- Died: January 5, 1987 (aged 89); Kyiv, Ukrainian SSR
- Occupation: Mathematician

Josif Zakharovich Shtokalo (Ukrainian: Йосип Захарович Штокало, romanized: Yosyp Zakharovych Shtokalo; November 16, 1897 – January 5, 1987) was a Ukrainian mathematician. Shtokalo worked mainly in the areas of differential equations, operational calculus and the history of mathematics.

== Biography ==
He was born on November 16, 1897 in Skomorokhy, Sokal, Galicia.

Shtokalo began studying mathematics at the Dnipropetrovsk University in 1927. He published his first paper, named Handbook of Mathematics for Workers in Heavy Industry, in 1928.

He left the university in 1931 to attend the Ukrainian Research Institute of Mathematics and Mechanics of Kharkov University. He published his thesis in 1934, on the topic of the pressure of a flux of finite width on a plane lamina. That same year he began teaching and was appointed as the head of mathematics at the Kharkov Textile Institute. During this time he would begin his extensive work on differential equations. In 1945 he published several more papers on the topic of linear differential equations.

From 1956 to 1963, Shtokalo was the head of the Department of History of Mathematics at the Institute of Mathematics, a part of the Ukrainian Academy of Sciences. After this, he became the head of the technology and science section of the Institute of History, also in the Ukrainian Academy of Sciences. He held this position from 1963 to 1986.

He died on January 5, 1987 in Kyiv, Ukrainian SSR.

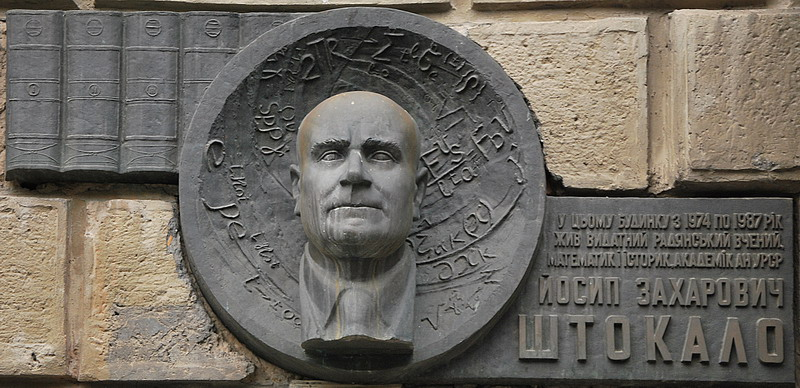
Plaque of Shtokalo in front of the apartment he lived in.

== Contributions to mathematics ==
Shtokalo published several works on the history of mathematics, specifically on advancements made by Ukrainian mathematicians. Some works include, Achievements in Mathematical Science in the Academy of Sciences of the URSR During the 30 Years of Russian Hegemony (1947), and Achievements in Mathematics in the Taras Shevchenko Kiev State University in the Years of Soviet Power (1957).

Investigation of the Stability of Lindstedt's Equation Using Shtokalo’s Method by Samuel Kohn contains a description of Shotkalo's method in English.
