= Kosta Josipović =

Serbian painter

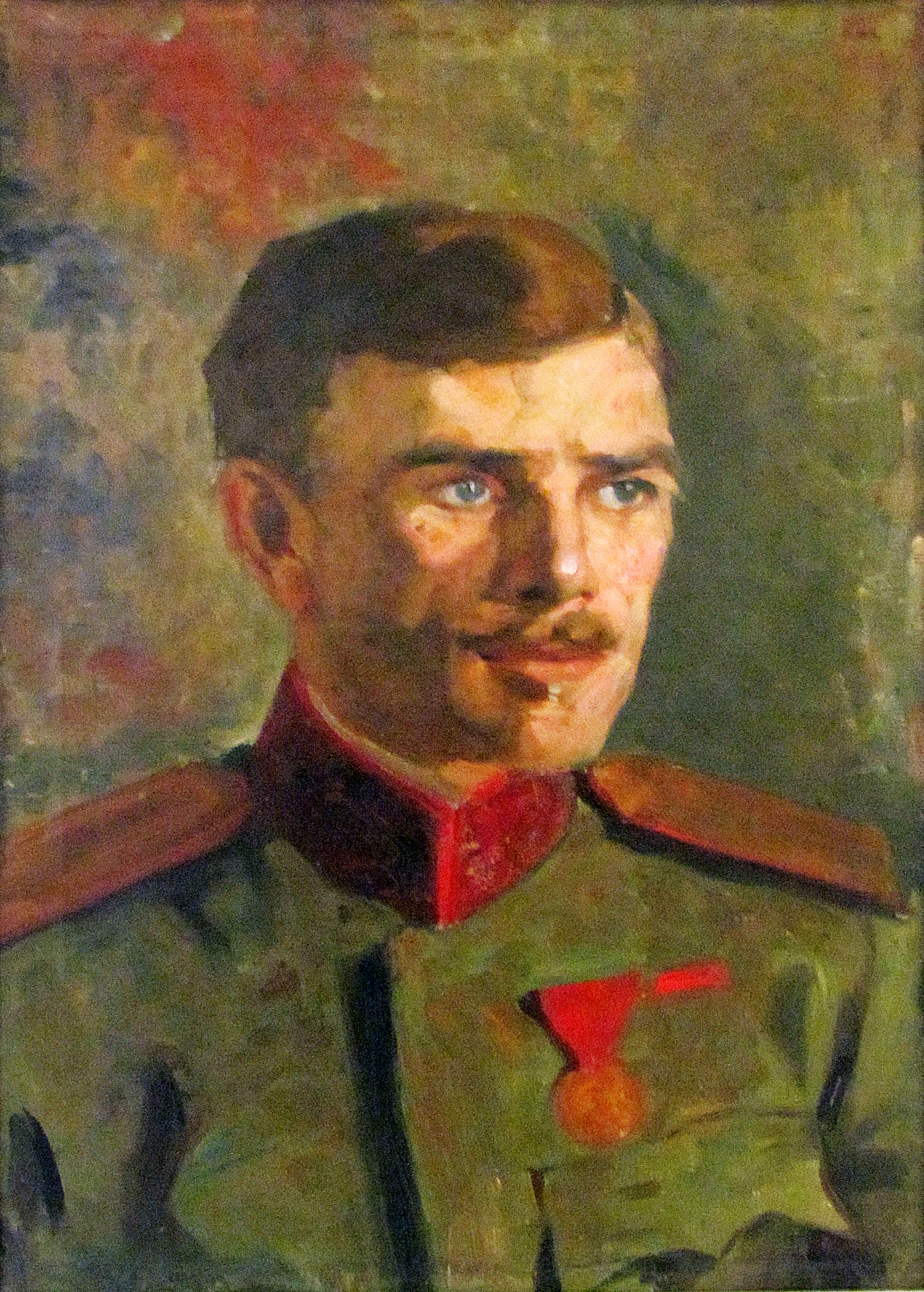
Kosta Josipović

Kosta Josipović (2 May 1887, Belgrade, Kingdom of Serbia – 7 August 1919, Skopje, Kingdom of Serbs, Croats and Slovenes) was a Serbian Impressionist painter.

== Biography ==
Kosta was born in 1887 in Belgrade, in a clerical family. As a talented person, he studied painting with Rista Vukanović in the first generation of students at the School of Arts and Crafts. For that school - a newly constructed building, he later made decorative elements. He continued his education at the age of 25, in Germany, with a state scholarship, where (since May 1912) he was in Munich Academy of Fine Arts in the class of professor Hugo von Habermann. At that time he befriended Živorad Nastasijević, Mihailo Milovanović and other Serbian art students who left Germany either in 1912 or 1914 for Serbia to join the military at the outbreak of the First Balkan War, Second Balkan War and the Great War. Before and after returning from Munich, he lived and worked in Belgrade. He taught drawing - graphic sketching in Belgrade schools in 1911. In 1911, Dragutin Inkiostri Medenjak took him to Italy, to Turin and later to the International Exhibition of Modern Decorative and Industrial Arts in Paris.

Wounded in the Balkan Wars and World War I, he was treated in Bizerte and Nice, where he constantly painted. His painting "On the Dead Guard" was exhibited in 1912 in Belgrade at the Fourth Yugoslav Exhibition. He returned to the military in 1918, to take part in the breakthrough of the Salonika front, where he was severely wounded. He died in a Skopje military hospital in 1919.

As an impressionist, Kosta Josipović called Sos is known for his work "Sailboats on the Water", which he modelled on Claude Monet. In 1909, he painted a portrait of the girl Jela Kovačević in pastel, and in 1910, "Portrait of Mrs. Živković".

He painted icons (16) on the iconostasis of the Serbian Orthodox Church in the village of Ribnica, near Mionica.

Known for the painting "Before Bitola" inspired by a historical event from the First Balkan War. Unlike the epic painting of Paja Jovanović and other contemporaries, Josipović paints a historical moment in a completely new and unusual way without a tendency towards the glorification of his army. There is no icy frame in which the actors are caught in the heat of battle at the most dramatic moment. Josipović figures paintings without portrait characteristics and without striving for characterization. The figures are so organized and painted that they create a very convincing illusion of movement. A year later, Aleksa Šantić wrote a song with the same name, perhaps inspired by this ingenious work by Kosta Josipović. His wartime historical composition "Crossing Albania" was unfortunately lost.

== Sources ==
- Jovan Sekulić: "Munich School and Serbian Painting", Belgrade 2002.
- "State Calendar of the Kingdom of Serbia" for 1911, Belgrade 1911.
- Stanislav Živković: "Serbian Impressionists", Belgrade 1994.
- Stanislav Živković: "Kosta Miličević", Novi Sad 1970.
- "Proceedings of the National Museum in Belgrade 5/1967.

== See also ==
- List of Serbian painters

== Literature ==
- Živković, С. (2009): The Indestructible World of Spiritual Beauty. Interprint.
