= Andrej Plenković =

Prime Minister of Croatia since 2016

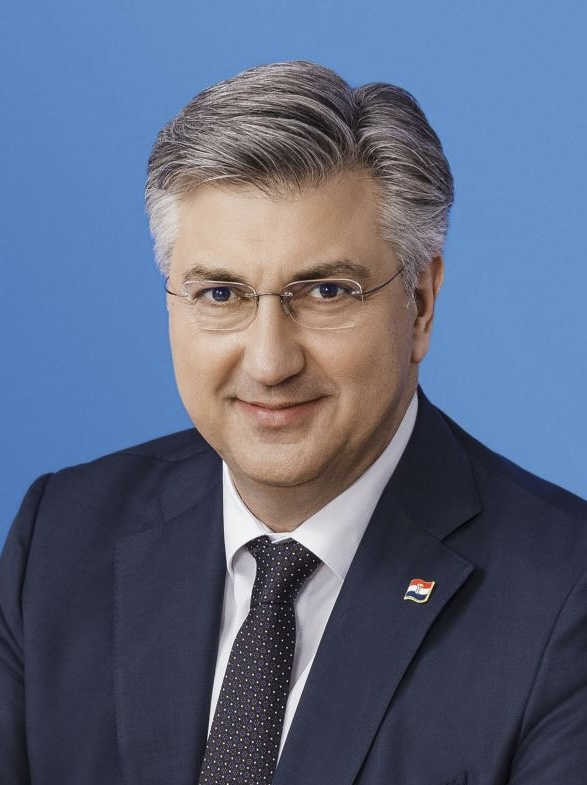
- Official portrait, 2024

Prime Minister of Croatia
- Incumbent
- Assumed office 19 October 2016
- President: Kolinda Grabar-Kitarović; Zoran Milanović
- Preceded by: Tihomir Orešković

President of the Croatian Democratic Union
- Incumbent
- Assumed office 17 July 2016
- Secretary-General: Gordan Jandroković; Krunoslav Katičić
- Preceded by: Tomislav Karamarko

Member of the European Parliament
- In office 1 July 2013 – 12 October 2016
- Constituency: Croatia

Member of the Croatian Parliament
- In office 22 December 2011 – 28 September 2015
- Constituency: VII electoral district

Personal details
- Born: 8 April 1970 (age 56) Zagreb, SR Croatia, SFR Yugoslavia (modern Croatia)
- Party: Croatian Democratic Union (2011–present)
- Spouse: Ana Maslać (m. 2014)
- Children: 3
- Education: University of Zagreb
- Website: Official website

Andrej Plenković (pronounced [ǎndrej plěːŋkoʋit͡ɕ]; born 8 April 1970) is a Croatian politician who has served as prime minister of Croatia since 2016. He is the leader of the Croatian Democratic Union (HDZ), serving since 2016. Plenković is the longest-serving Croatian prime minister. He has been the longest-serving head of government in the European Union (EU) since 2026. Plenković is a conservative moderate and has moved the HDZ towards the political centre.

After graduating from the Zagreb Faculty of Law in 1993, Plenković began his career in Croatia’s Ministry of Foreign Affairs before supporting Croatia’s mission to the EU. From 2005 to 2010, he was deputy ambassador to France. He served in the Croatian Parliament from 2011 to 2015. After becoming the State Secretary for European Integration, he served in the European Parliament from 2013 to 2016. A year later, he was elected president of the HDZ and led the party to victory in the 2016 parliamentary election becoming prime minister. Plenković has led three governments with multiple cabinets – winning successive elections in 2016, 2020, and 2024. His complex coalition-building has led to civil unrest, including the 2024 Zagreb protest.

As prime minister, he led the nation through the COVID-19 pandemic and two earthquakes in Zagreb and in Petrinja in 2020. His government materially increased defence spending and expanded large-scale infrastructure projects, particularly in the energy sector. He facilitated Croatia's integration into the Eurozone and the Schengen Area, circulating the euro throughout the Croatian economy. He has maintained foreign policy multilateralism, sending military aid to Ukraine and strengthening NATO integration. Plenković's structural reforms since 2022 has slated Croatian accession into the OECD by late 2026.

== Early life and education ==
Plenković was born on 8 April 1970 in Zagreb to a university professor, Mario Plenković, from Svirče on the island of Hvar, and cardiologist Vjekoslava Raos. He attended elementary and the 16th Grammar School in Zagreb. As his GPA was below A range, Plenković had to write and submit a thesis to obtain his Matura. His thesis The Means of Mass Communication was published in 1989 by the office of printing and publishing companies in Yugoslavia. He was exempted from a then-mandatory conscription for a one-year active duty with the Yugoslav People's Army due to his diagnosis of thalassemia minor, a mild form of anemia, and he was deemed unfit for military service. This fact has been often put at issue later on by his political opponents during electoral campaigns, especially due to the fact that his mother worked as a doctor in a military hospital in Zagreb.

He enrolled in the Faculty of Law at the University of Zagreb in 1988, graduating in 1993 with dissertation Institution of European Community and the Decision-Making Process at the department of International public law under Professor Nina Vajić, a former judge of the European Court of Human Rights in Strasbourg.

During university, Plenković worked as a volunteer translator in the observing mission of the European Community in Croatia from 1991 to 1992. At the beginning of the 1990s, he became interested in Europe and actively participated in European Law Students Association (ELSA), of which he was president in Zagreb in 1991. He was the first president of ELSA Croatia in 1992 and president of the international ELSA committee, situated in Brussels. During that time Plenković participated in numerous conferences throughout Europe and the United States, as well as organising numerous symposiums in Croatia. As a student, he interned in the London law firm Stephenson Harwood in 1992 and following this, an internship in the European People's Party in the European Parliament (as a part of Robert Schuman Foundation program). He also worked in the Croatian mission for the European Community in 1993 and 1994, which was then chaired by Ambassador Ante Čičin-Šain.

In the Ministry of Foreign Affairs, Plenković completed a programme to become a diplomat, and in 1992, passed the consultation exam at the diplomatic academy. Plenković passed the Bar in 2002. At the law faculty of the University of Zagreb, he finished his master's degree in International public and private law and got the title of Master of Science in 2002 by defending his Masters thesis by the title of "Subjectivity of EU and development of the common foreign and security policy" under the tutorage of Professor Budislav Vukas, a judge of International Tribunal for the Law of the Sea in Hamburg.

== Diplomatic career (1994–2011) ==
From 1994 to 2002, Plenković worked at different positions within the Ministry of Foreign Affairs. Among other things as a chief of the department of European integration, adviser of minister for European affairs, and member of the negotiation team on the Treaty on Stabilisation and Accession.

From 2002 to 2005, Plenković was a deputy chief of Croatian mission for the European Union in Brussels. He was in charge of the coordination of political activities of the mission and he worked on networking with the officials of the European Commission, Council, Parliament and other permanent representations of various member states. He was working on Croatian application for membership in the European Union in 2002, and in 2003, making pressure for the status of candidate country in 2004 and for the opening of the accession negotiations in 2005.

From 2005 to 2010, Plenković was serving as the deputy ambassador in France where he was in charge of political and organizational issues. During his diplomatic career, Plenković participated in numerous symposiums, seminars and programs on international and European law, international, foreign relations and foreign policy and management.

=== State Secretary in the Ministry of Foreign Affairs ===
Appointed by the Minister of Foreign Affairs Gordan Jandroković, Plenković worked as a state secretary for European integration during the government of Prime Minister Jadranka Kosor. He had a prominent role in the campaign for a referendum on EU membership. Together with numerous media appearances, Plenković held dozens of lectures on joining the European Union in all Croatian counties.

As a state secretary, Plenković also performed the duties of the political director for EU affairs, co-chair of the Stabilisation and Association Croatia–EU, national coordinator for the Danube Strategy of the European Union and co-chairman of the duties of the international commissions (Bavaria-Croatia, Croatia-Baden-Württemberg, Croatia-Flanders). He was on a board member of the Foundation for Civil Society Development, president of the Organizing Committee of the Croatia Summit in 2010 and 2011, and secretary of the Organizing Committee of the pastoral visit of the Pope Benedict XVI in 2011.

== Political engagement (2011–present) ==
=== Member of the Croatian Parliament ===
In 2011, after seventeen years of professional work in diplomacy, Plenković joined the Croatian Democratic Union (HDZ). From December 2011 to July 2013, he was a member of the Croatian Parliament from the 7th electoral district. Plenković was also a deputy member of delegation of the Croatian Parliament, the Parliamentary Assembly of the Mediterranean, and a member of a group of friendship with Bosnia and Herzegovina, Italy, France, Malta and Morocco. At that time, he was also active in the City of Zagreb's politics, specifically in the Črnomerec district, where he met many of his friends in the party. After being elected to the European Parliament, Plenković first transferred his mandate to Damir Jelić, who was shortly after succeeded by Nada Murganić.

=== Member of the European Parliament ===
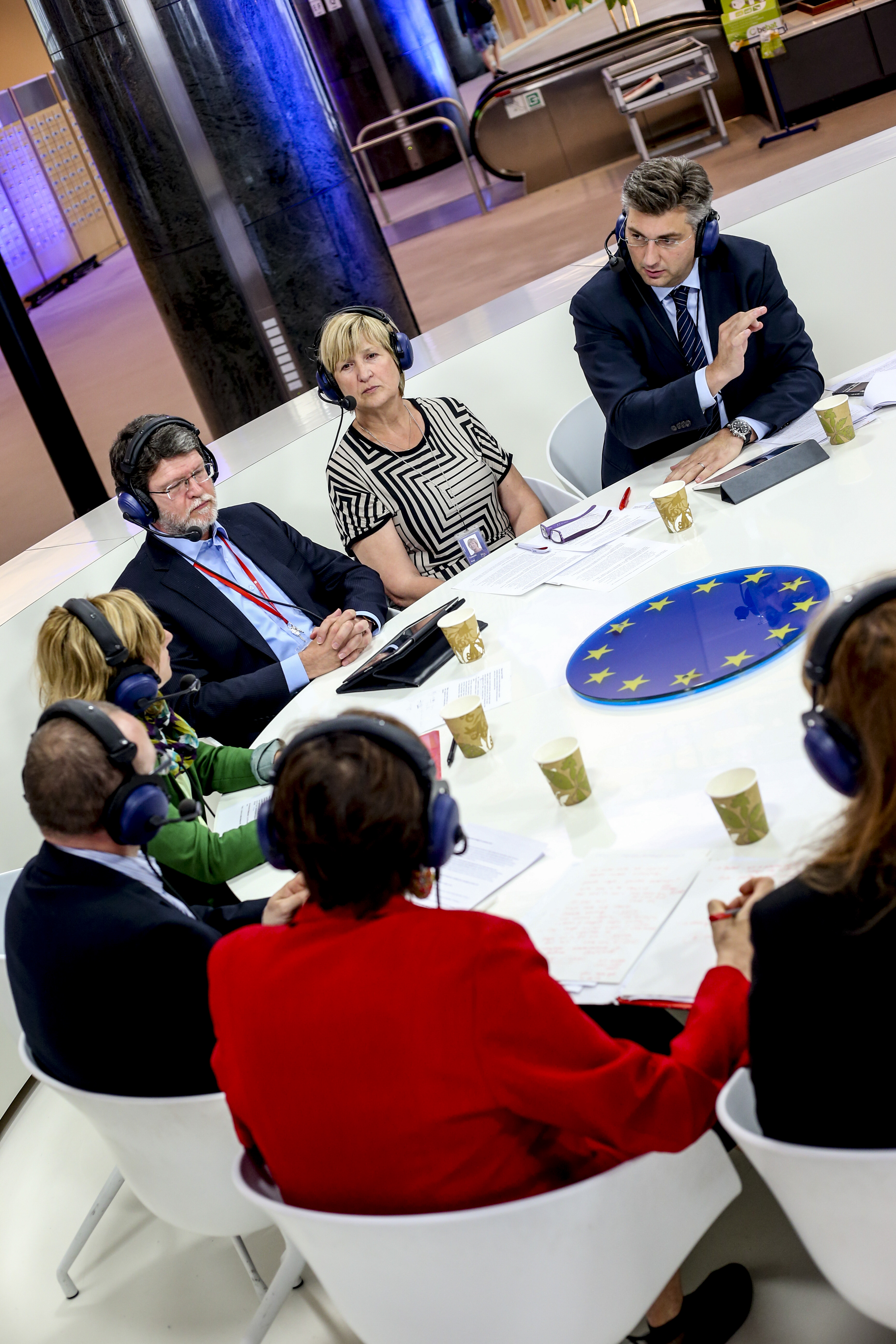
Plenković during Croatian part-Citizens’ Corner debate on EU policies for asylum seekers and immigrants, 17 June 2015

Prior to the 2012 European Union membership referendum, Plenković held a series of lectures on the European Union at party rallies across Croatia and participated in numerous public debates and TV and radio shows. By the decision of the Croatian Parliament from April 2012 until July 2013, Plenković was one of the twelve Croatian observers in the European Parliament. In his capacity as an observer, he supported the completion of the ratification process of the Treaty on Croatian accession to the European Union, the positive reports and resolutions on Croatia and the appropriate allocation of EU funds to Croatia in the Multiannual Financial Framework (MFF) 2014–2020.

As an HDZ candidate on the joint list for the first Croatian elections to the European Parliament, which were held on 14 April 2013, he actively participated in the election campaign. He participated in the drafting of the HDZ programme for the European elections, "a Croatian voice in Europe", adopted by the presidency of the party led by President Tomislav Karamarko. The program was based on the main principles of the platform of the European People's Party and its program documents, as well as the priorities of Croatia in the European Union from the perspective of the HDZ. He was elected to the winning coalition list, where he received the highest number of preferential votes among the HDZ candidates.

Between 2013 and 2014, Plenković was a member of the Committee on Budgets. From 2014, he served as vice-chairman of the European Parliament Committee on Foreign Affairs and a member of the parliament's delegation to the Euronest Parliamentary Assembly. He led the parliament's monitoring mission during the Ukrainian parliamentary election in 2014. In addition to his committee assignments, Plenković was a member of the European Parliament Intergroup on SMEs; the European Parliament Intergroup on Wine, Spirits and Quality Foodstuffs; the European Parliament Intergroup on Youth Issues; and the European Parliament Intergroup on Disability.

=== President of the Croatian Democratic Union ===
Plenković was elected president of the HDZ on 17 July 2016, in a sign it was distancing itself from ultra-conservative elements. In the 2016 parliamentary election, he led his party to an unexpected victory. The opposition-led People's Coalition conceded defeat after winning only 54 seats in Parliament. Its leader, former Prime Minister Zoran Milanović, ruled out running for reelection to his party's chairmanship, effectively also ruling out any possible attempts to form a governing majority, thus allowing the HDZ to begin talks with the Bridge of Independent Lists. The Bridge was in a coalition with the HDZ in the outgoing government led by non-partisan Prime Minister Tihomir Orešković, who lost a vote of no confidence. The Bridge set out seven conditions for entering into a government with any party and Plenković began discussions lasting several weeks with their representatives, who later gave in on some demands. He also held talks with the eight representatives of national minorities. Over the next few weeks several other parties, including the Croatian Peasant Party (HSS), proceeded to give their support to a government led by Plenković. However, it is widely viewed that HSS chairman Krešo Beljak, who was leaning center-left, agreed to give Plenković the support of his five party's MPs and "100 days of peace before turning into the sharpest opposition" in order to calm tensions resulting from a dispute between him and HSS MEP Marijana Petir, who had called for HSS to enter the centre-right coalition instead of remaining a part of the People's Coalition as an opposition party. The dispute escalated and Beljak proceeded to suspend over 100 members of the party, including Petir. Plenković also received the support of the Bandić Milan 365 party. He formally received 91 signatures of support from MPs on 10 October 2016, far more than the necessary 76, and presented them to President Kolinda Grabar-Kitarović, who named him prime minister-designate and gave him thirty days time until 9 November to form a government.

== Premiership (2016–present) ==
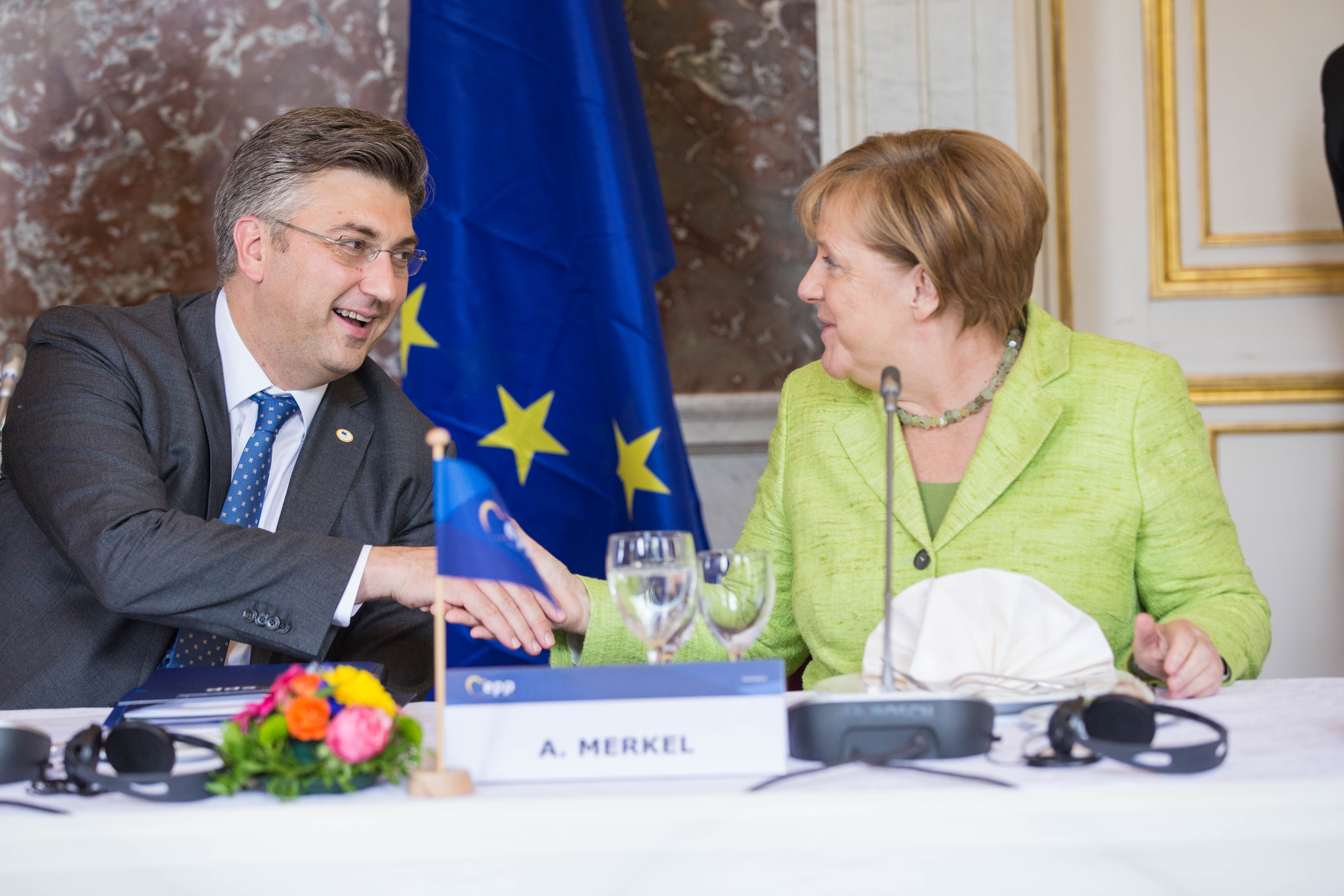
Plenković with German Chancellor Angela Merkel, 22 June 2017

Plenković was confirmed as the 12th prime minister of Croatia along with his cabinet of 20 ministers by a vote of 91 in favor, 45 against and 3 abstentions among 151 members of Parliament on 19 October 2016. His government received the support of MPs belonging to the HDZ-HSLS-HDS coalition, Bridge of Independent Lists, Bandić Milan 365, HSS, HDSSB, SDSS and 5 representatives of other national minorities. Plenković presented his cabinet as "the government that knows how to bring about changes", and stressed out social dialogue, economic growth stimulation, and a tax reform as the government's priorities.

=== Government crisis and cabinet reshuffle ===
On 27 April 2017, Plenković dismissed three of his government ministers from The Bridge of Independent Lists, the junior partner in the governing coalition, over their reluctance to support a vote of confidence in Finance Minister Zdravko Marić, whom The Bridge accused of withholding certain information relating to an ongoing crisis involving one of Croatia's largest firms, Agrokor, where Marić had worked a few years previously. Namely, The Bridge considered that Marić had knowledge of irregularities occurring in the way Agrokor paid its suppliers and had chosen not to reveal that information in order to protect the firm. On 28 April, the last remaining government minister from The Bridge, Ivan Kovačić, resigned his post and the party announced its withdrawal from the ruling coalition. The HDZ started to gather signatures from members of parliament to push through a vote of no confidence in the speaker Božo Petrov, who was also the president of The Bridge at the time. At the same time, the HDZ announced that it would seek to form a new governing majority in Parliament, bypassing The Bridge. With Most deciding to withdraw its parliamentary support for the Plenković cabinet, Božo Petrov resigned as speaker on 4 May to avoid a no confidence vote, and was succeeded by HDZ's Gordan Jandroković. Now without the support of The Bridge, the HDZ-dominated cabinet was left without a clear parliamentary majority and the possibility of yet another early parliamentary election, the third in 18 months, taking place was extremely heightened. However, the government crisis was ultimately resolved on 9 June 2017 when 5 out of 9 members of parliament representing the Croatian People's Party (HNS) agreed to enter a coalition with the HDZ, while the other four MPs (among them Vesna Pusić and Anka Mrak Taritaš) decided to leave HNS and form a new political party called the Civic Liberal Alliance (GLAS). The Plenković cabinet underwent a reshuffle, with HNS being given the portfolios of Science and Education and Construction and Spatial Planning.

Since May 2017, Plenković has been constantly named the most negative politician in Croatia by monthly polls conducted by the Promocija Plus and IPSOS PULS agencies. However, by December 2017, he was also named the third most popular politician, while his party enjoyed considerable rating advantage over all other political parties in Croatia.

=== Domestic policy ===
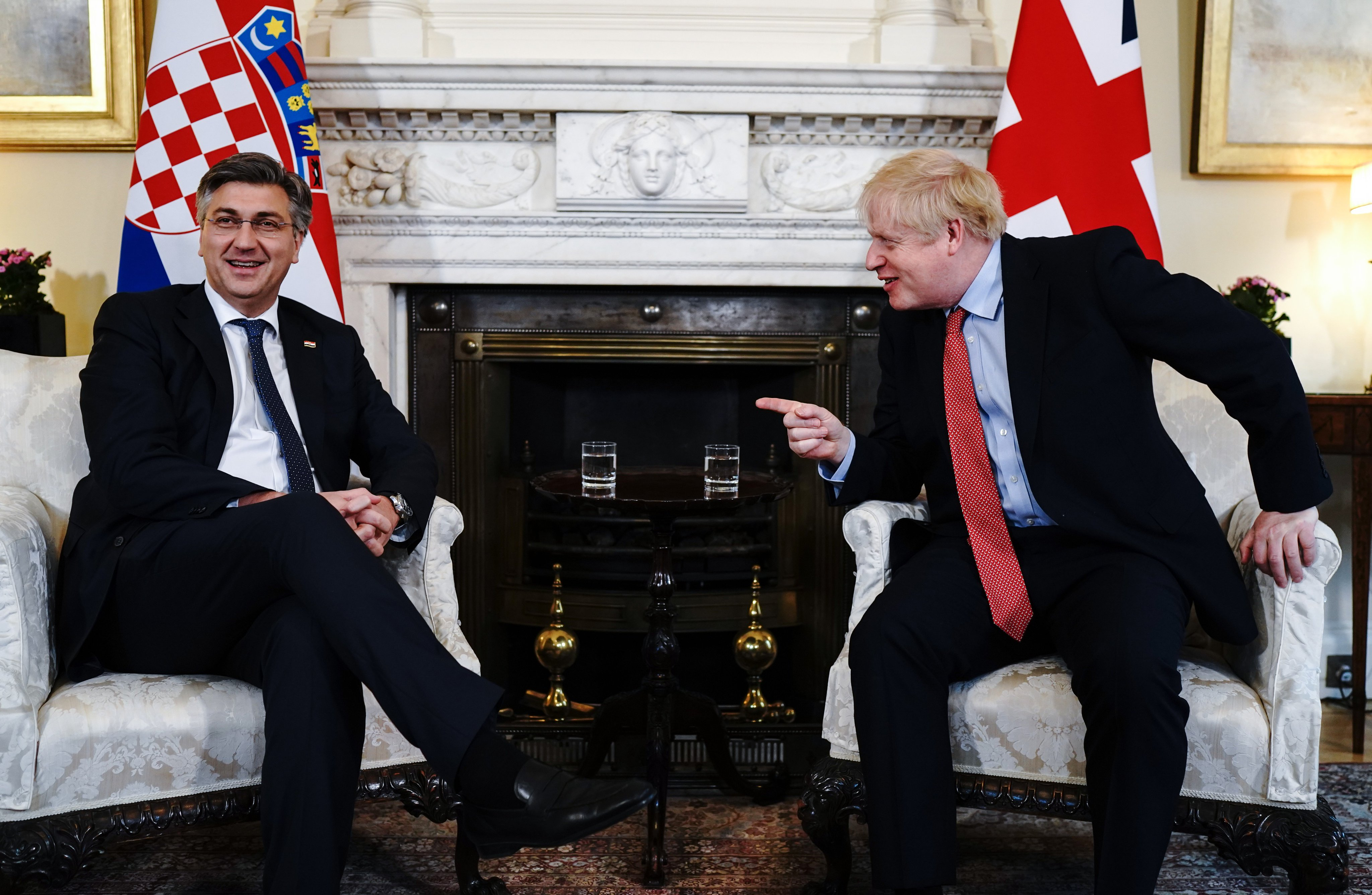
Plenković and British prime minister Boris Johnson at 10 Downing Street in London, 24 February 2020

Following a deal with the HNS, the government introduced an education reform starting with a pilot program in the 2018/2019 school year. The renewable energy tariff was raised in August 2017 to stimulate the production of renewable energy, which is the source of 28% of the country's energy demand. The move also resulted in increased electricity bills. The Croatian Parliament ratified the convention on preventing and combating violence against women and domestic violence, known as the Istanbul Convention, in April 2018. Though there was a split within the HDZ over ratifying the convention, the Plenković cabinet unanimously supported it. In October 2018, the government introduced a pension reform bill that would penalise early retirement and set the retirement age to 67 starting from 2033, instead of 2038 as defined by a 2014 law. The move sparked large protests from trade unions. They launched a referendum initiative against the law and collected more than 700,000 signatures. Instead of calling a referendum, the government backed down and lowered the retirement age back to 65.

A nationwide strike of teachers in primary and secondary schools started on 10 October 2019, following the government's refusal to increase their wages by 6%. The strike halted all classes in schools. The strike lasted until 2 December, when teachers’ unions and the government agreed to a gradual increase in wages of 6% by 2021.

==== Economy ====
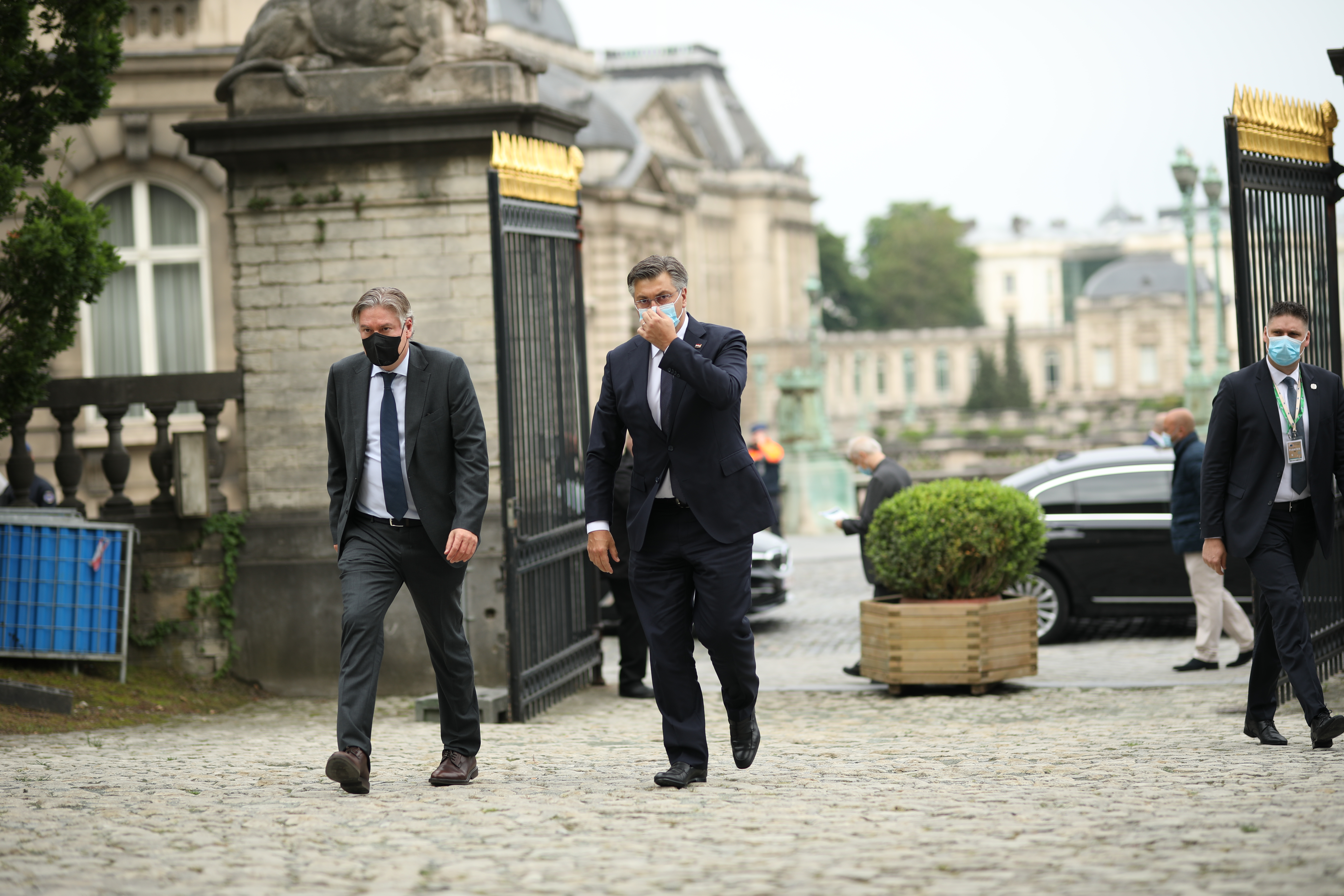
Plenković arriving to an EPP summit in Vienna, 24 June 2021

The new government introduced a tax reform starting from January 2017 and set the reduction of the budget deficit as the main goal of the 2017 budget. The initial tax reform proposal from Zdravko Marić, the finance minister who retained his position from the previous cabinet, caused some disagreements between the two member parties of the ruling coalition, the HDZ and the Most. The modified proposal included a reduction in corporate income tax from 20% to 18% for large companies and 12% for small and mid-level companies. Personal income tax rates were changed from 12%, 25% and 40% into tax rates of 24% and 36%. Discontent over the tax reform was voiced by trade unions, as well as the tourism sector because the VAT for their services was raised from 13% to 25%.

On 30 October 2017, Plenković declared that Croatia plans to join the Eurozone within seven to eight years. In December 2017, the government increased the minimum wage by 5% for 2018 and adopted several new laws, including the allocation of the income tax revenue entirely to local administrative units and lower payments to the state when purchasing used cars. The introduction of a property tax, which received a negative public reaction, was postponed indefinitely.

Croatia's general government recorded a surplus of €424.5 million in 2017 or 0.9% of GDP, attributed to an increase in income from taxes related to manufacturing and imports, and a reduction in interest payments. The debt-to-GDP ratio decreased by 2.7 percentage points from 2016, to 77.5%, and GDP growth was 2.9%. Negative migration and population trends continued in 2017, with a record high number of emigrants since joining the EU. The Croatian Employers' Association said that reforms stalled following the income tax cuts in early 2017, causing a slower economic growth. A March 2018 report by the European Commission also stressed out the lack of structural reforms, particularly in fiscal policy, the social benefits system, and the pension system.

A pension reform was adopted in 2018. Highly contested by workers' unions, it raises the legal retirement age to 67 for all employees, instead of 65 for men and 62 for women previously.

Plenković confirmed the eventual Croatian accession into the OECD in late 2026, following structural reforms initiated in 2022.

=== Corruption allegations ===
His government has been affected by numerous corruption scandals. Between 2016 and 2023, some 30 ministers involved in scandals were excluded from the government. The controversial appointment of Attorney General Ivan Turudić, suspected of colluding with suspects and defendants in criminal cases, and criticized by the opposition for his closeness to the HDZ. Plenković and Attorney General Turudić have also attempted to block the European Public Prosecutor's Office (EPPO), which is responsible for investigating cases of corruption and fraud involving EU funds, claiming that it is not competent to deal with the investigations it has launched against Croatian civil servants.

=== Foreign policy ===
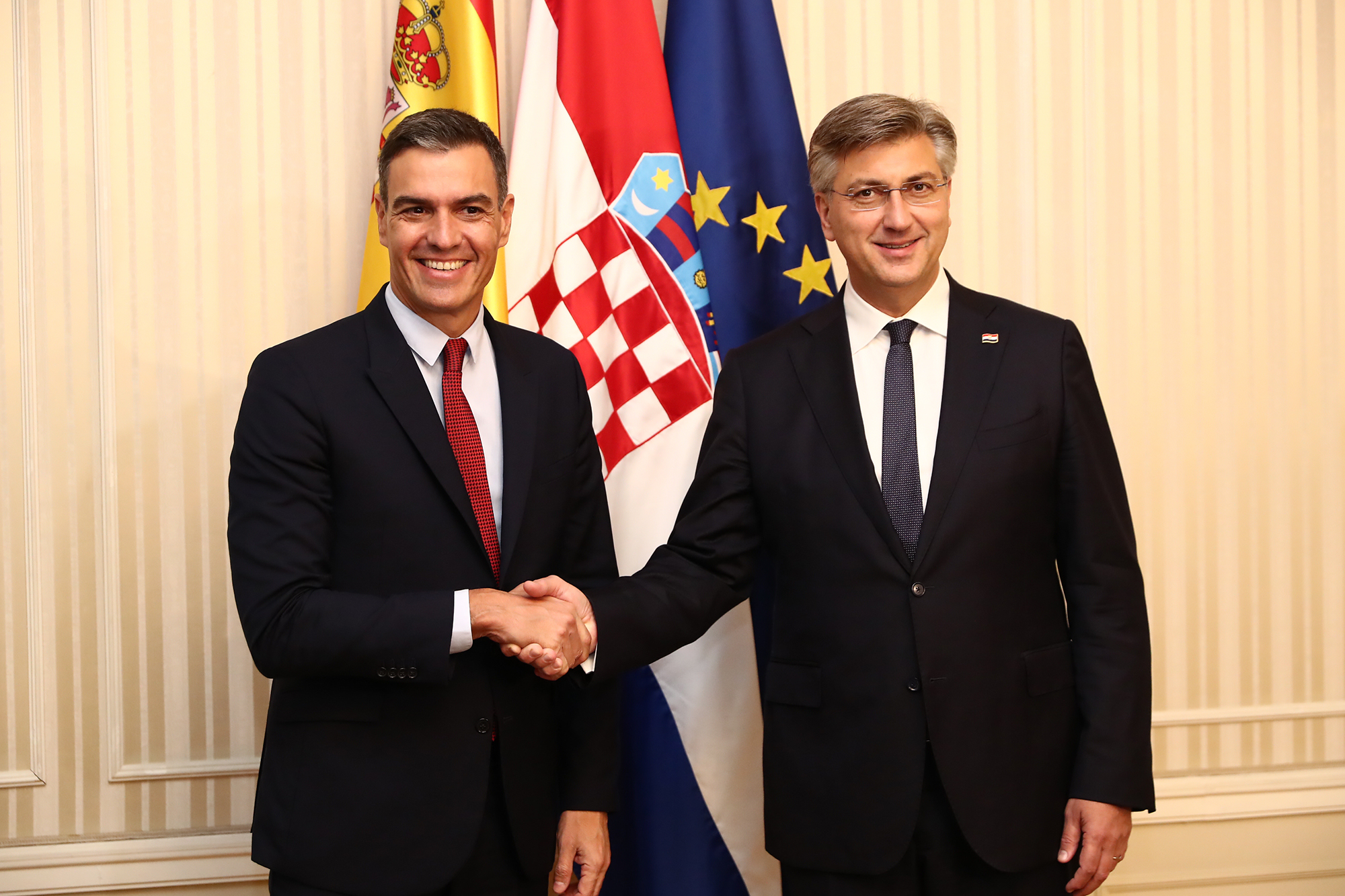
Plenković alongside Spanish Prime Minister Pedro Sánchez, 6 October 2021

After attending his first European Council summit on 20 October 2016, in an address to the Croatian Parliament, Plenković said that "there is no need for Croatia to build border fences". Plenković's first official foreign visit was to Sarajevo, Bosnia and Herzegovina on 28 October 2016. Plenković said that his government will support Bosnia and Herzegovina on its path towards membership in the European Union. Discussions were held regarding the political rights of Bosnian Croats, mostly in terms of bringing their political rights to the level enjoyed by Bosniaks and Bosnian Serbs. In November, he visited Ukraine where he met with Prime Minister Volodymyr Groysman. Plenković expressed support for a peaceful reintegration of the areas of Ukraine under the control of pro-Russian rebels. The two governments established a working group to share Croatia's experience with the reintegration of eastern Slavonia in 1998. The Russian Ministry of Foreign Affairs commented that the visit "raised serious concerns in Russia".

On 29 June 2017, the Arbitral Tribunal on the border dispute between Slovenia and Croatia ruled in favour of Slovenia regarding its access to international waters. The decision was welcomed by the Slovenian Government, and dismissed by the Croatian Government as not legally binding. Croatia withdrew from the arbitration process in 2015, during the premiership of Zoran Milanović, after a leaked tape showed the Slovenian judge in the case exchanging confidential information with Slovenian officials. Plenković called for bilateral talks to resolve the issue, while Slovenia insists on the implementation of the arbitral decision. The European Commission announced that it will remain neutral in the border dispute.

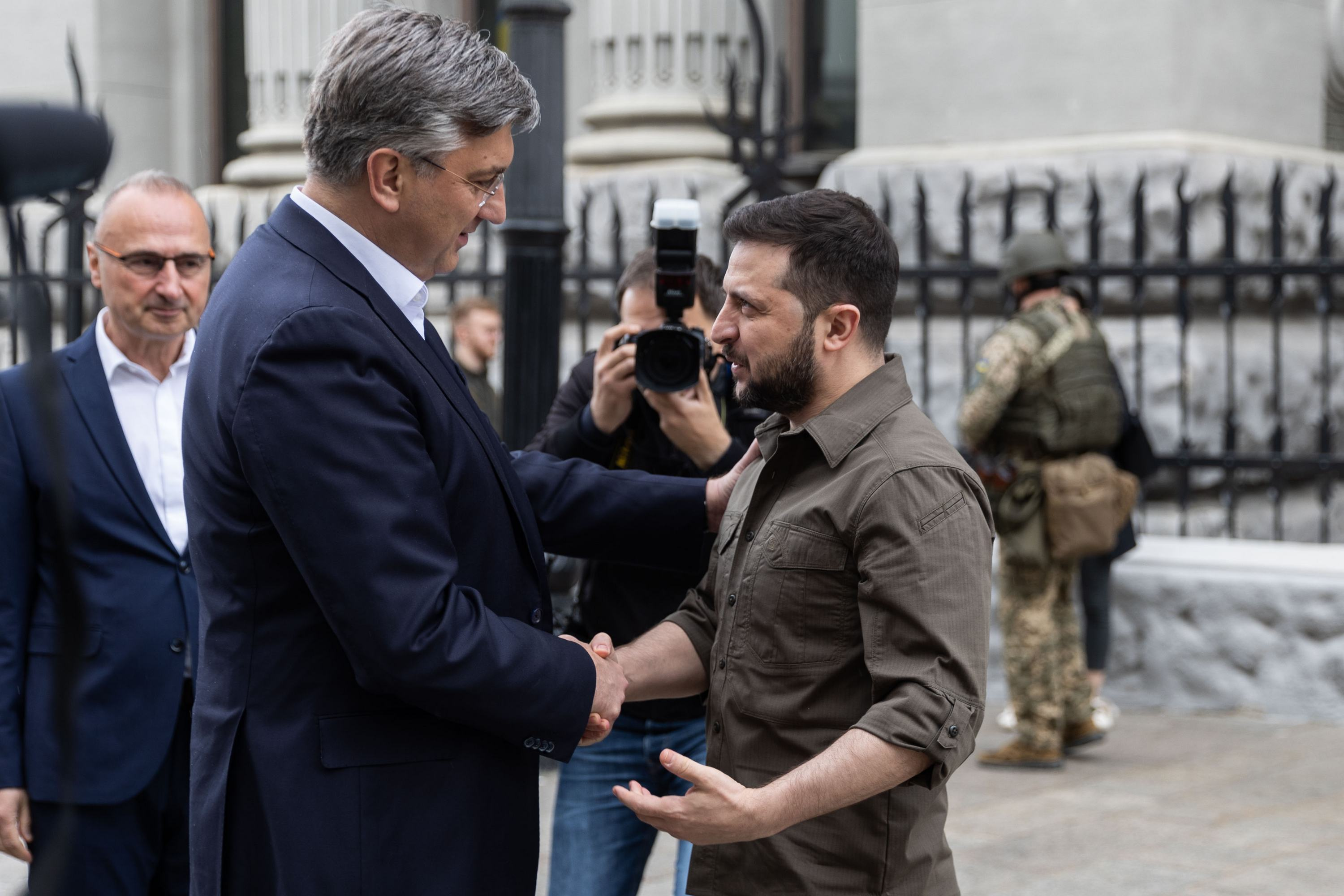
Plenković greeting Ukrainian President Volodymyr Zelenskyy, 8 May 2022

After the final verdict in the war crimes trial against former high-ranking officials of Herzeg-Bosnia, followed by the suicide of Slobodan Praljak, Plenković stated that Praljak's suicide illustrated the "deep moral injustice towards the six Croats from Bosnia and Herzegovina and the Croatian people". The ICTY prosecutors and its president criticized the statements from Croatian officials and called on them to accept the court's findings. Plenković later said that his country accepted the verdict and expressed "regrets and condolences very clearly for all the victims of the crimes mentioned in this verdict".

Plenković endorsed the incumbent Dragan Čović in the 2018 election for the Croat member of the Presidency of Bosnia and Herzegovina. Following the election of Željko Komšić as the Croat member of the presidency, largely due to votes in majority Bosniak areas, Plenković criticized Komšić's victory: "We are again in a situation where members of one constituent people ... are electing a representative of another, the Croat people". Komšić responded that the Croatian Government is undermining Bosnia and Herzegovina and its sovereignty. Komšić also announced that Bosnia and Herzegovina might sue Croatia over the construction of the Pelješac Bridge. The construction of the bridge, paid largely with EU funding, began on 30 July 2018 to connect Croatia's territory and was supported by Komšić's main election opponent Dragan Čović.

Plenković affirmed the government's support for the Global Compact for Migration. Interior Minister Davor Božinović represented Croatia at the adoption of the agreement, after President Kolinda Grabar-Kitarović announced she would not participate at the conference.

Along with Latvian Prime Minister Arturs Kariņš, Plenković represented the governments ruled by the centre-right European People's Party (EPP) in the negotiations on new appointments to top posts in the European Union following the 2019 European elections, including the European Council, European Commission and the European Central Bank.

Plenković became the first sitting prime minister to visit Canada, joining Canadian prime minister Mark Carney in June 2026 amid the 2026 FIFA World Cup to discuss bilateral relations.

== Political positions ==
Commentators mostly described Plenković's political positions as pro-European and moderate, and his election as an exception in a eurosceptic trend in Europe. Some observers described his positions as moderate conservative, or simply as conservative.

Plenković described his policy as "devoid of extremes and populism", and his political views as centre-right.

== Personal life ==
Plenković is married to lawyer Ana Maslać, with whom he has a son. In early November 2016, it was reported that the couple were expecting their second child, a daughter. In late March 2022, the couple welcomed their third child, another son.

Besides his native Croatian, Plenković speaks English, French and Italian fluently, and is conversant in German.

== Honours ==
Ribbon	Award or decoration	Country	Date
	Order of Prince Yaroslav the Wise, 1st class	Ukraine	23 August 2025
	Order of Merit, 1st class	Ukraine	23 August 2021
	Order of Merit, 3rd class	Ukraine	21 August 2015

== See also ==
- List of current heads of state and government
- List of heads of the executive by approval rating

Political offices
Preceded by Tihomir Orešković	Prime Minister of Croatia; 2016–present	Incumbent
Party political offices
Preceded by Tomislav Karamarko	President of the Croatian Democratic Union; 2016–present	Incumbent
Diplomatic posts
Preceded by Sanna Marin	Presidency of the Council of the European Union; 1 January 2020–1 July 2020	Succeeded by Angela Merkel
