= Tatjana Josipović =

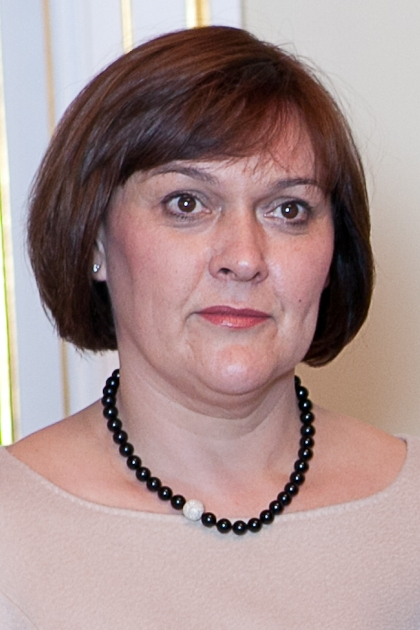

First Lady of Croatia
- In role 19 February 2010 – 18 February 2015
- President: Ivo Josipović
- Preceded by: Milka Mesić
- Succeeded by: Jakov Kitarović

Personal details
- Born: Tatjana Klepac; 14 May 1962 (age 64) Zagreb, PR Croatia, FPR Yugoslavia
- Spouse: Ivo Josipović (m. 1990)
- Children: 1
- Education: University of Zagreb
- Occupation: University professor

Tatjana Josipović (née Klepac; born 14 May 1962) is a Croatian jurist and professor at the Faculty of Law of the University of Zagreb. She is the wife of Ivo Josipović, the President of Croatia from 2010 to 2015.

== Life and education ==
Tatjana Klepac was born on May 14, 1962, in Zagreb, SFR Yugoslavia (now Croatia).

She earned her bachelor's degree from the Faculty of Law of Zagreb University in May 1985 and passed the judiciary exam in 1987. In 1990 she earned her master's degree from Zagreb University and a doctorate in 1996.

== Academic career ==
From 1997 to 2000, Josipović was an associate professor at the Faculty of Law at the University of Zagreb and a professor of law from 2000 to 2009. For several periods, she served as head of Civil Law Chair at the same faculty. From 2003 to 2005, Josipović was vice-dean.

== Memberships ==
Josipović is a member of the scientific council for law at the Croatian Academy of Arts and Science. She is also a member of the Croatian Academy of Legal Sciences, a corespondent member of the German Gesellschaft für Rechtsvergleichung and the Academia Europaea.

== Personal life ==
She is married to former Croatian President Ivo Josipović, who is also a jurist and a fellow professor at the Faculty of Law of Zagreb University, as well as a musician and composer. They have a daughter named Lana (b. 1990).
