= Ivo Josipović =

President of Croatia from 2010 to 2015

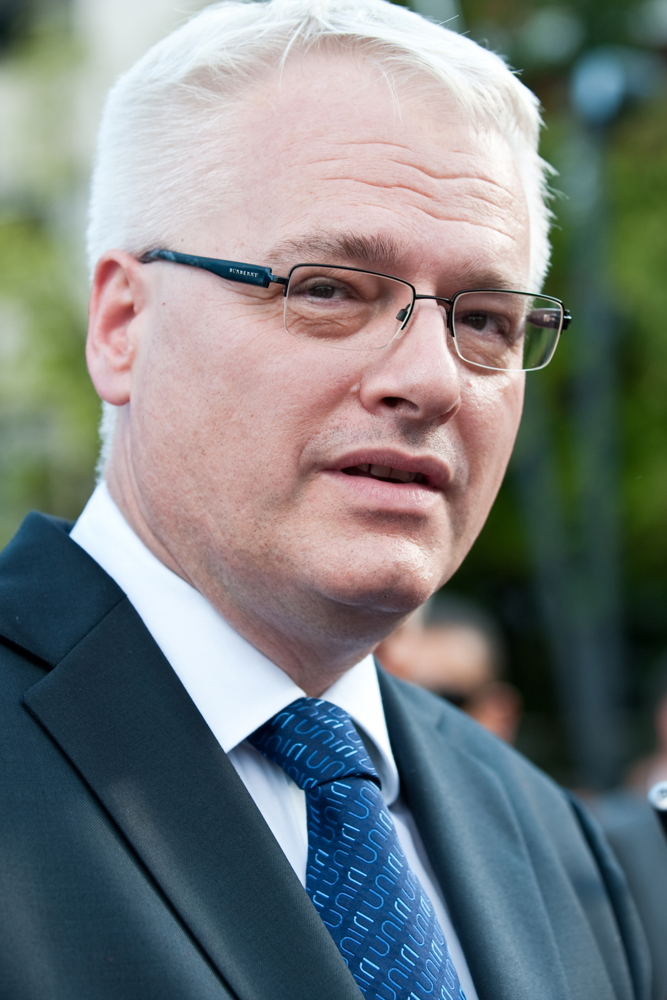
- Josipović in 2011

President of Croatia
- In office 19 February 2010 – 18 February 2015
- Prime Minister: Jadranka Kosor; Zoran Milanović
- Preceded by: Stjepan Mesić
- Succeeded by: Kolinda Grabar-Kitarović

Member of the Croatian Parliament
- In office 22 December 2003 – 18 February 2010
- Constituency: I electoral district

President of the Forward Croatia-Progressive Alliance
- In office 31 May 2015 – 11 April 2019
- Preceded by: Position established
- Succeeded by: Position abolished

Personal details
- Born: 28 August 1957 (age 69) Zagreb, PR Croatia, FPR Yugoslavia (modern Croatia)
- Party: Social Democratic Party (1990–1994, 2008–2010, 2019–present)
- Other political affiliations: League of Communists of Croatia (1980–1990); Forward Croatia-Progressive Alliance (2015–2019)
- Spouse: Tatjana Klepac (m. 1990)
- Children: 1
- Education: University of Zagreb
- Profession: Lawyer; composer
- Website: Official website

Ivo Josipović (pronounced [ǐːʋo josǐːpoʋitɕ]; born 28 August 1957) is a Croatian academic, jurist, composer, and politician who served as the president of Croatia from 2010 to 2015.

Josipović entered politics as a member of the League of Communists of Yugoslavia (SKJ), and played a key role in the democratic transformation of the League of Communists of Croatia (SKH) into the Social Democratic Party (SDP) as the author of its first statute. He left politics in 1994, but returned in 2003, winning a seat in the Croatian Parliament running as an independent candidate on the SDP party list. He won re-election to parliament as a member of the SDP in 2007. In addition to politics, Josipović has also worked as a university professor, legal expert, musician and composer, and holds a Ph.D. in Law and advanced degrees in music composition.

Following the end of his first term in Parliament in January 2008, he ran in the 2009–10 presidential election as the candidate of the Social Democratic Party of Croatia (SDP), which he had rejoined in January 2008. In the first round he topped eleven rivals with 32.4% of the vote, and entered the run-off with independent conservative populist candidate and Mayor of Zagreb, Milan Bandić, who had secured 14.8%. He won the election with 60.26% of the vote in the second round of the election.

His campaign was titled "Nova pravednost" (New Justice), calling for a new legal framework to address deep social injustice, corruption and organised crime. This included protection of individual rights and promotion of fundamental values such as equality, human rights, LGBT rights, justice, diligence, social empathy and creativity. Josipović was inaugurated on 18 February 2010, at St. Mark's Square in Zagreb. His term officially began at midnight on 19 February.

Josipović sought reelection in the 2014–15 presidential election held on 28 December 2014. He was supported by the centre-left four-party Kukuriku coalition, led by the SDP. Josipović won 38.46% of the vote in the first round, finishing narrowly ahead of conservative HDZ candidate Kolinda Grabar-Kitarović. They entered a run-off, which took place on 11 January 2015 and which Josipović ultimately lost by a slim margin of around 32,500 votes, winning 49.3% of the vote to Grabar-Kitarović's 50.7%. He is the first President of Croatia not to be reelected to a second term.

== Biography ==
Josipović's parents, originally from Baška Voda, a small town near Makarska in Dalmatia, had moved to capital Zagreb in 1956, about a year before he was born. As a high school student, Josipović attended both the V. Gymnasium and a secondary music school in Zagreb from 1972 to 1976. As a teenager he was a promising football player. He is married to Tatjana, a civil law professor and legal expert. They have one daughter, Lana (born c. 1991).

Apart from his native Croatian, he speaks English fluently and has some understanding of German.

=== Law ===
Josipović attended the Faculty of Law of the University of Zagreb, from which he graduated passing his bar examination in 1980. He completed his MA in criminal law in 1985 and his PhD in criminal sciences in 1994. He began as a lecturer at the same law faculty in 1984, and has since become a Professor for criminal procedure law, international criminal law and misdemeanour law.

Josipović has been a visiting researcher at a number of prestigious institutes including the Max Planck Institute for Foreign and International Criminal Law in Freiburg in Breisgau, Germany, the Institute for Criminal Law of the University of Graz, Austria, as well as the HEUNI Institute (European Institute for Crime Prevention and Control) in Helsinki, Finland. He has also spent time as a private researcher at the Max Planck Institute for Foreign and Private International Law in Hamburg, Germany as well the Yale University in the United States. As member of several domestic and international legal and artists' associations he published over 85 academic and professional papers in domestic and international journals. In year 1994, he co-founded the independent Hrvatski pravni centar (Croatian Law Center). Josipović helped to save 180 Croatian prisoners of war from Serbian detention centers and has represented Croatia before the International Court of Justice (ICJ) and the International Criminal Tribunal for the former Yugoslavia (ICTY). He participated in several international projects and acted as a Council of Europe expert in evaluation of prisons in Ukraine, Mongolia and Azerbaijan.

=== Music ===
After graduating from a secondary music school he enrolled at the Composition Department of the Zagreb Music Academy under the tutelage of renowned scholar Stanko Horvat. He graduated in 1983 majoring in composition. Between 1987 and 2004 Josipović was also a lecturer at the Zagreb Music Academy.

Josipović composed some 50 chamber music pieces for various instruments, chamber orchestra and symphony orchestra. In 1985 he won an award from the European Broadcasting Union for his composition "Samba da Camera" and in 1999 he was awarded the Porin award for the same composition, which was followed by another Porin award in 2000 for his piece titled "Tisuću lotosa" (A Thousand Lotuses). His most successful pieces also include "Igra staklenih perli" (The Glass Bead Game) and "Tuba Ludens". These pieces are performed by numerous musicians in Croatia and abroad. Since 1991 Josipović also served as director of the Music Biennale Zagreb (MBZ), an international festival of contemporary classical music.

During the 2010 election campaign Josipović announced that as president he would compose an opera based on the murder of John Lennon. On April 22, 2023, Josipović's opera, Lennon, about the last days of John Lennon, the people who were important to him, and a psychological profile of his murderer, premiered in Croatia's National Theatre.

=== Film ===
Josipović was interviewed in Boris Malagurski's documentary film The Weight of Chains 2 (2014). Josipović lent his voice to the third film of the Toy Story series and in a short animated film Night and Day. Josipović at the beginning of the film pronounces the sentence, in Croatian, "Best things in life are unknown, turn to new things". Opening the Pula Film Festival, in 2014, President Josipović called for the audience to enjoy movies and art. "For some, film is the most beautiful and noble fraud, while for some, filmmakers are magicians. Indeed, they put in a big hat under the stars a lot of important spices and most importantly the talent and love for the art", said Josipović.

=== Politics ===
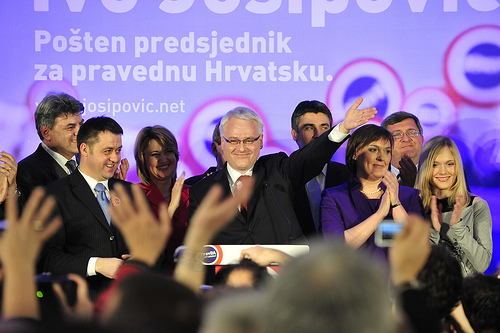
Victory speech of Josipović, 10 January 2010

In 1980, Josipović became a member of the League of Communists of Croatia (SKH). He played a vital role in the democratic transformation of this party as the author of the first statute of the Social Democratic Party of Croatia (SDP). In 1994, he left politics and the SDP, dedicating himself to law and music. Upon the invitation of Ivica Račan, acting prime minister at the time, he returned to politics in 2003 and became an independent MP with the SDP and vice-president of the SDP representatives' group in the Croatian Parliament. During his mandate in 2005, he was also a representative in the Assembly of the City of Zagreb. In 2007, he was re-elected to the Croatian Parliament. He formally renewed his SDP membership in 2008. On 12 July 2009, he was elected as the party's official presidential candidate. As MP, he served on various parliamentary committees dealing with legislative, judiciary and constitutional questions, as well as for defining parliamentary rules of procedure and the political system.

== Presidential election 2010 ==
After serving two consecutive five-year terms, the incumbent president Stjepan Mesić was not eligible to run in the scheduled 2009 presidential election. On 20 June 2009, Josipović was nominated as one of the official SDP candidates for the 2009–10 Croatian presidential election. He won in a primary against Ljubo Jurčić on 12 July, becoming the party's official candidate.

Josipović based his campaign on the slogan 'Justice for Croatia' and kicked off his campaign with a rally in front of the Croatian National Theatre in Zagreb. He attacked the current Croatian government and the Prime Minister Jadranka Kosor for ignoring the needs of the little man and criticized her for not dealing with corruption.

On 27 December 2009, Josipović won the first round of the presidential election with 32.42% of the vote. He faced Milan Bandić, an expelled member of the SDP running as an independent, (runner-up with 14.83%) in the second round on 10 January 2010. Subsequently, on 10 January 2010 he was elected as the third president of Croatia with 60.26% of the vote, beating Bandić in the second round.

== President of Croatia ==
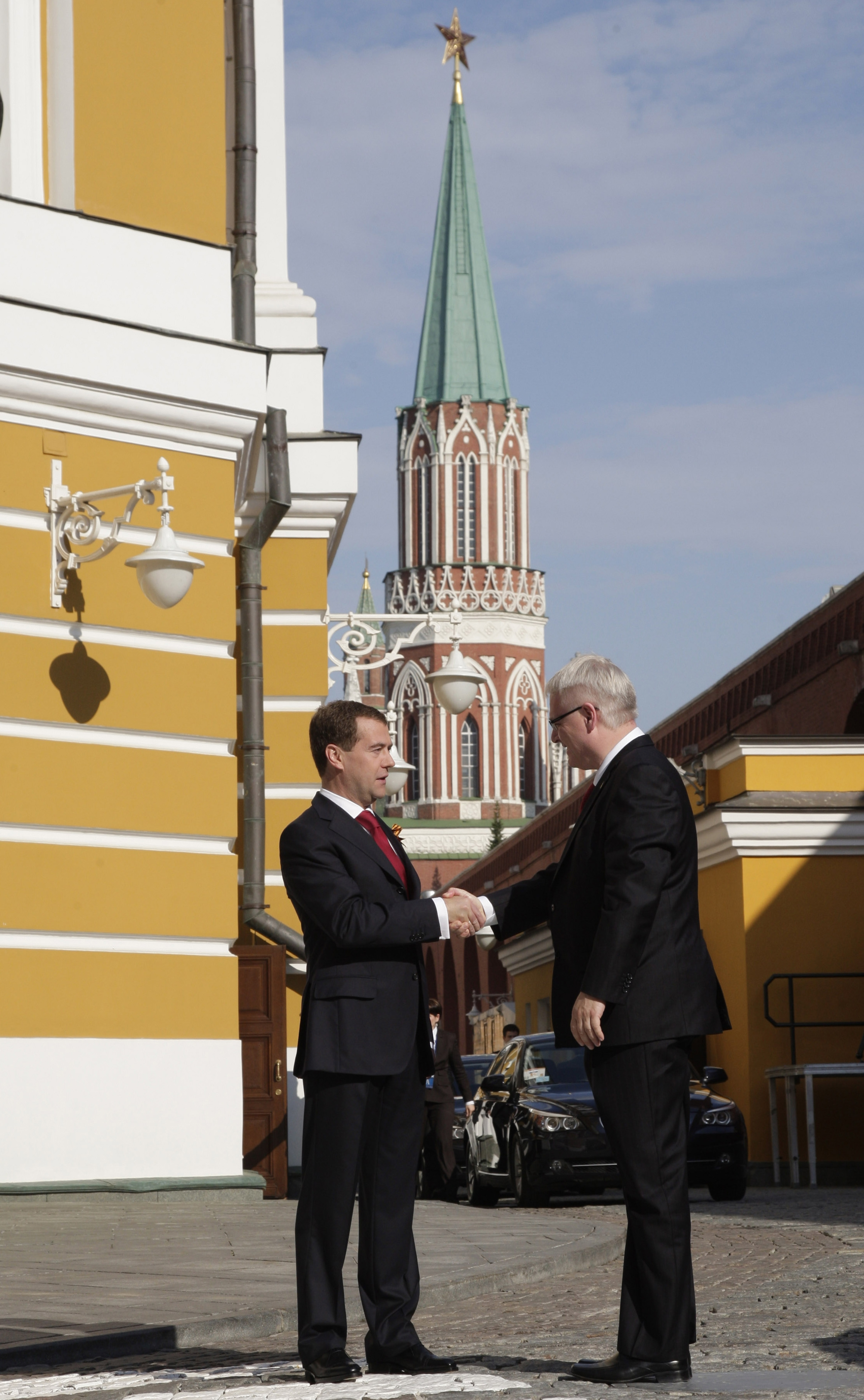
Russian president Dmitry Medvedev with Josipović in 2010

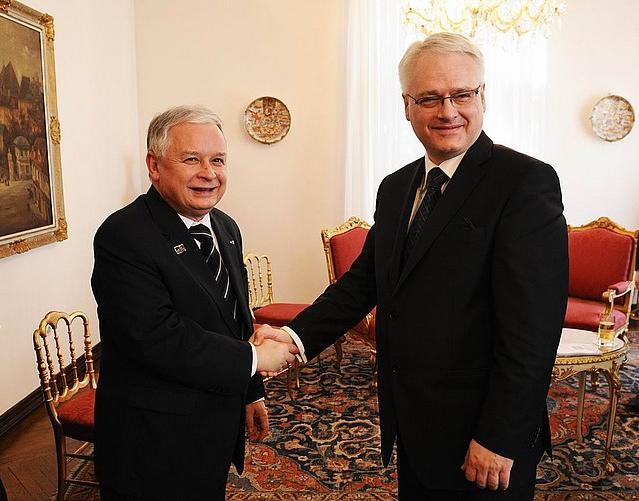
Polish president Lech Kaczyński with Josipović in 2010

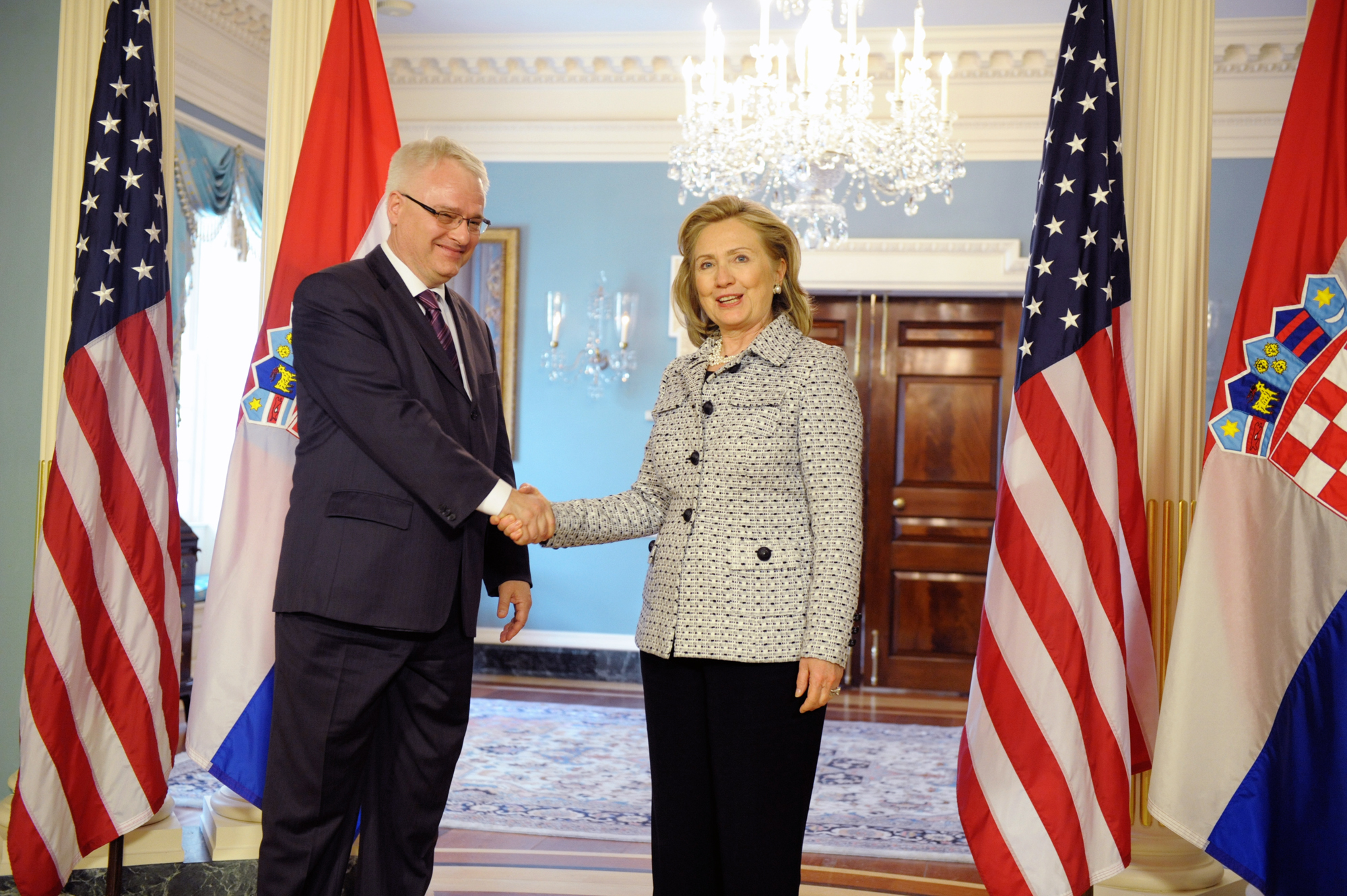
Josipović with U.S. Secretary of State Hillary Clinton in Washington, D.C., 3 May 2011

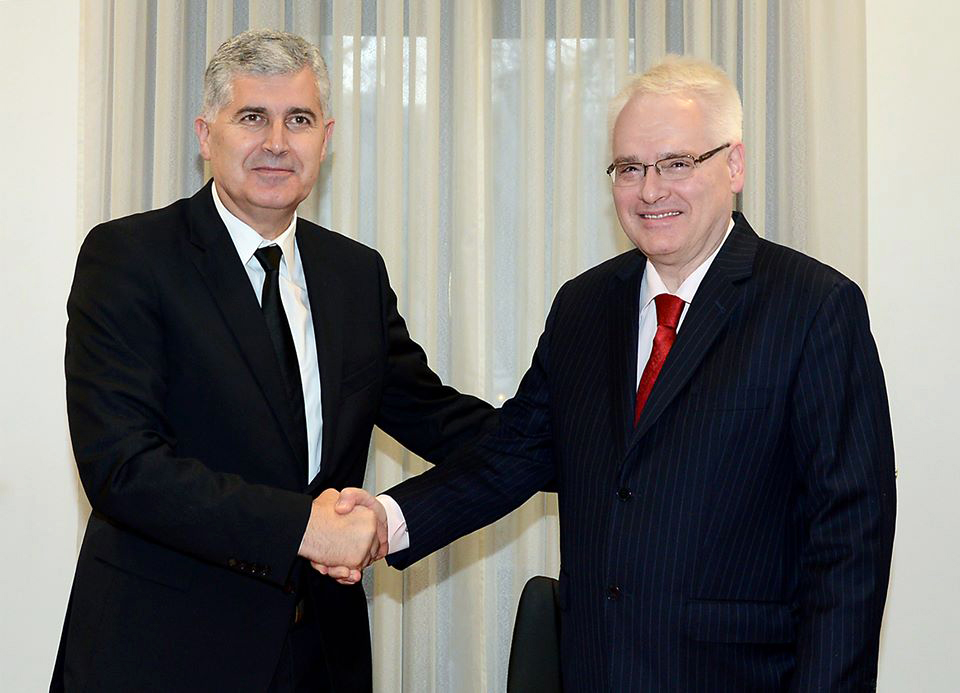
Bosnian Presidency member Dragan Čović with Josipović in 2014

In April 2010, Josipović met with the Bosnian Croat Catholic archbishop cardinal Vinko Puljić and the head of the Islamic Community reis Mustafa Cerić and the three made a joint visit at the sites of Ahmići massacre and Križančevo selo killings, and paid respect to the victims. Josipović made an official visit to Bosnia and Herzegovina during which he addressed the Parliamentary Assembly, and in his speech he expressed a "deep regret" for Croatia's involvement in efforts to divide Bosnia and Herzegovina in the 1990s, resulting in the Croat–Bosniak war and suffering for many people on both sides. The presidency of the Croatian Democratic Union condemned the apology. Jadranka Kosor, the current prime minister and president of the Croatian Democratic Union, criticized Josipović and accused him of breaching the constitution. The vice president of the Croatian Democratic Union, Andrija Hebrang, contested that Josipović should have visited Bleiburg before Ahmići and Grabovica.

He has chosen a couple of counselors who have caused scandals. Josipović's first option as counselour for rural areas and agriculture was Mato Mlinarić, who was dismissed two hours after being appointed when the press discovered that he had some non-paid tax debts. Former journalist Drago Pilsel served as Josipović's counselor for a month, but left the position after a publishing a column in which he insulted his opponents.

In May 2010, Josipović met the leaders of the Republika Srpska, Rajko Kuzmanović and Milorad Dodik, as well as the prominent Bosniak leader Sulejman Tihić, and visited the site of the Sijekovac killings to pay respect to the victims. The site and the visit provoked some controversy in the Croatian public, with allegations of impropriety levelled against President Josipović and the authorities of Republika Srpska for misattributing some of the casualties. During a visit to Israel in February 2012, Josipović apologized for atrocities committed against Jews by the Croatian Ustaše regime during the 1940s. Josipović's apology was accompanied by criticism in Croatia because his predecessor Stjepan Mesić had already apologized earlier for the crimes. Josipović also said that "he is the son of Tito's partisan". During a speech at the commemoration for the victims of the Jasenovac concentration camp in May 2014, Josipović described the crimes that happened in Jasenovac as genocide. During his speech, Josipović stressed that the vast majority of Croatian people fought against Ustasha policies during the Second World War by participating in an anti-fascist movement, urging everyone not to forget that "exclusivity, hatred and intolerance and the evils of fascism and other totalitarian ideologies" are still present in today's societies so that WWII crimes would never repeat, stating that "unity and determination are the only true power against the new Auschwitz, Jasenovac, Ovčara and Srebrenica".

=== Standing in opinion polls ===
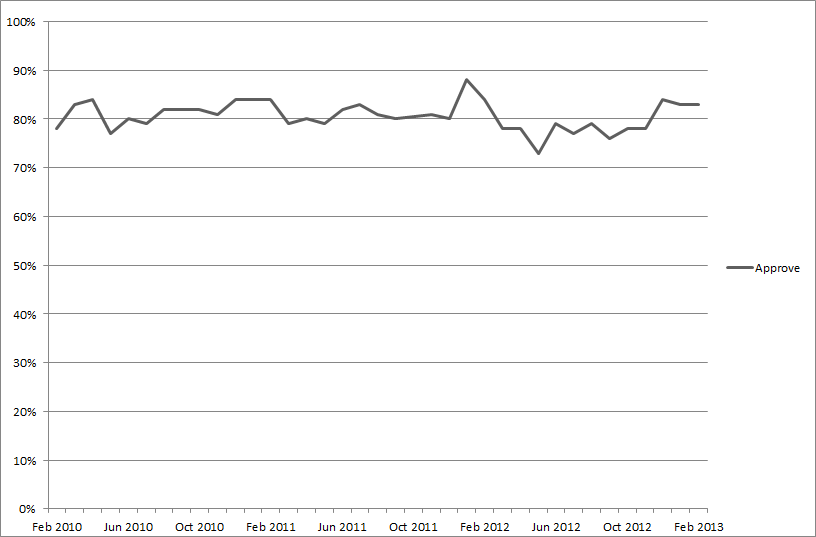
Ivo Josipović's approval ratings since taking office (conducted by IpsosPuls).

In 2010, Josipović had on average maintained a very high 81% approval rating (according to Ipsos), surpassing the former president Mesić. With ratings reaching as high as 84% in May, August and December in 2010 and 2011, Josipović was ranked as the most popular Croatian politician in the past 20 years (with the possible exception of Franjo Tuđman), since Croatia's secession from Yugoslavia. However, while he remains the most popular Croatian active politician, in the first half of the 2012 his popularity suffered a decline: from ratings of over 80% at the end of 2011 and 84% in February 2012, to 74.2% in March 2012 and 68.8% in April 2012. Also, according to the polls for the 2015 presidential elections, he had a lead of about 10% against the winner of the elections, raising doubts about the methodology of the surveys.

Ivo Josipović's approval ratings
Date	Event	Approval (%)
27 February 2010	Inauguration	78
25 March 2010	First month in office	83
30 April 2010	After apologizing in Croatia's name	84
25 November 2010	Serbian president apologizes for Vukovar	81
28 January 2012	Personal High	88
25 August 2014	Personal Low	68

== Presidential election 2015 ==
President Josipović announced plans to seek re-election in the 2014 presidential election, with his electoral program focusing on amendments to the constitution and the decentralization of Croatia.

The first round of elections took place on 28 December 2014, with Josipović narrowly coming in ahead of his main challenger Kolinda Grabar-Kitarović of the conservative Croatian Democratic Union. Josipović received 38.46% of the vote, which represented 22,000 more votes than Grabar-Kitarović, who was at 37.22%, but both failed to win more than 50% of the vote, leading to a run-off. As the two most voted candidates, Josipović and Grabar-Kitarović proceeded to the second round on 11 January 2015. As the votes were being counted on election night, Grabar-Kitarović was predicted as the winner by media sources, taking 51.4% according to exit polls. However, as official results began to come in, Josipović took an initial lead, but Grabar-Kitarović overtook the incumbent to ultimately win by a margin of only 32,509 votes, even as voting continued to take place in parts of Bosnia and Herzegovina, where problems had arisen due to issues with voting papers. Josipović lost the election by a wafer-thin margin of 1,989 votes if the diaspora vote is not taken into account and he conceded defeat to Grabar-Kitarović, who thus became the first female president-elect of Croatia, later in the evening. His term formally expired at midnight on 19 February 2015, while his successor had already been inaugurated on 15 February.

After having lost his bid for re-election Josipović founded a new political party called Forward Croatia-Progressive Alliance and announced that he planned to contest the upcoming parliamentary elections that were to be held in November 2015. Josipović also refused to have his own office and staff, to which he was entitled for a period of five years after leaving office as president.

== Parliamentary election 2015 ==
Josipović's Forward Croatia-Progressive Alliance signed a coalition agreement with the People's Party - Reformists, led by former economy minister Radimir Čačić. Josipović was a candidate in the 1st electoral district, where the coalition won only 1.01% of the vote (or 2,365 votes), compared with the 1.54% it received nationwide.

== Parliamentary election 2020 ==
Josipović was a candidate in the 1st electoral district as a member of the Restart Coalition (Croatian: Restart koalicija), led by Davor Bernardić, chairman of the SDP. He was not successful as he received 3,013 preferential votes, or 7.78% of all votes cast for the Restart Coalition in the 1st electoral district, under the 10% threshold required to be elected.

== Honours ==
Award or decoration	Country	Date
Order of Danica Hrvatska with the face of Marko Marulić	Croatia	27 May 1999
Order of the White Rose of Finland	Finland	15 May 2011
Order of St. Olav	Norway	12 May 2011
Order of Merit of the Italian Republic	Italy	6 July 2011
Order of the Three Stars	Latvia	2 April 2012
Order of the Seraphim	Sweden	16 April 2013
Order of the Polar Star	Sweden	16 April 2013
Order of the White Eagle	Poland	11 May 2013
Order of the Elephant	Denmark	21 October 2014

Political offices
Preceded by Stjepan Mesić	President of Croatia; 2010–2015	Succeeded by Kolinda Grabar-Kitarović
