= Croatia–Ukraine relations =

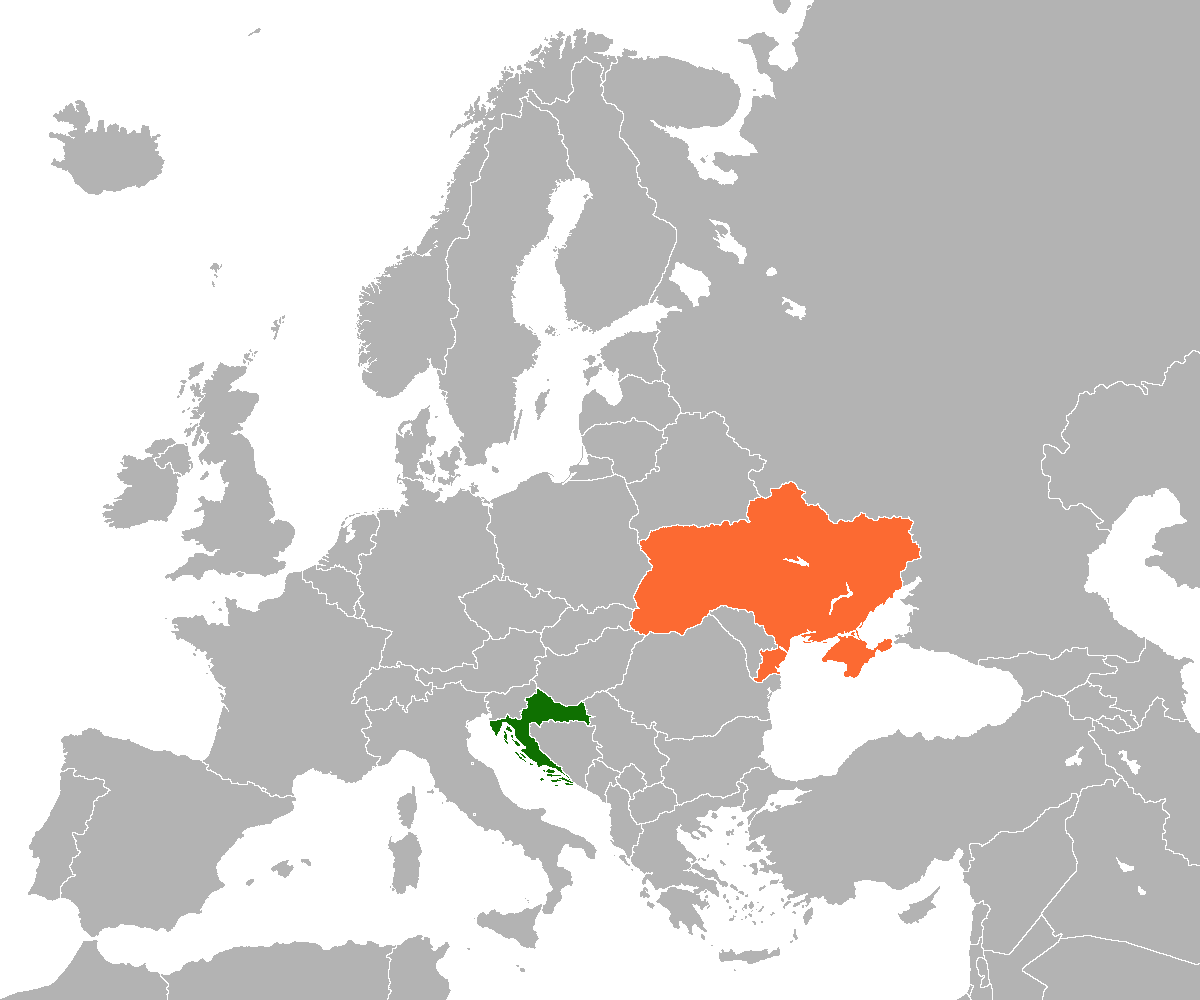

- Croatia: Ukraine

Diplomatic mission
- Embassy of Croatia, Kyiv: Embassy of Ukraine, Zagreb

Croatia–Ukraine relations (Ukrainian: Українсько-хорватські відносини, Croatian: Hrvatsko-ukrajinski odnosi) are foreign relations between Croatia and Ukraine. The countries established diplomatic relations on 18 February 1992. Croatia has an embassy in Kyiv and an honorary consulate in Donetsk. Ukraine has an embassy in Zagreb and honorary consulates in Malinska and Split.

Since the 2010s, Croatia's relationship to Ukraine has warmed, strengthened by geographic proximity, common political ideologies, and greater regional integration. Croatia supports Ukraine's European Union and NATO membership. It sanctioned Russia in favor of aiding Ukraine during the Russo-Ukrainian war.

== History ==
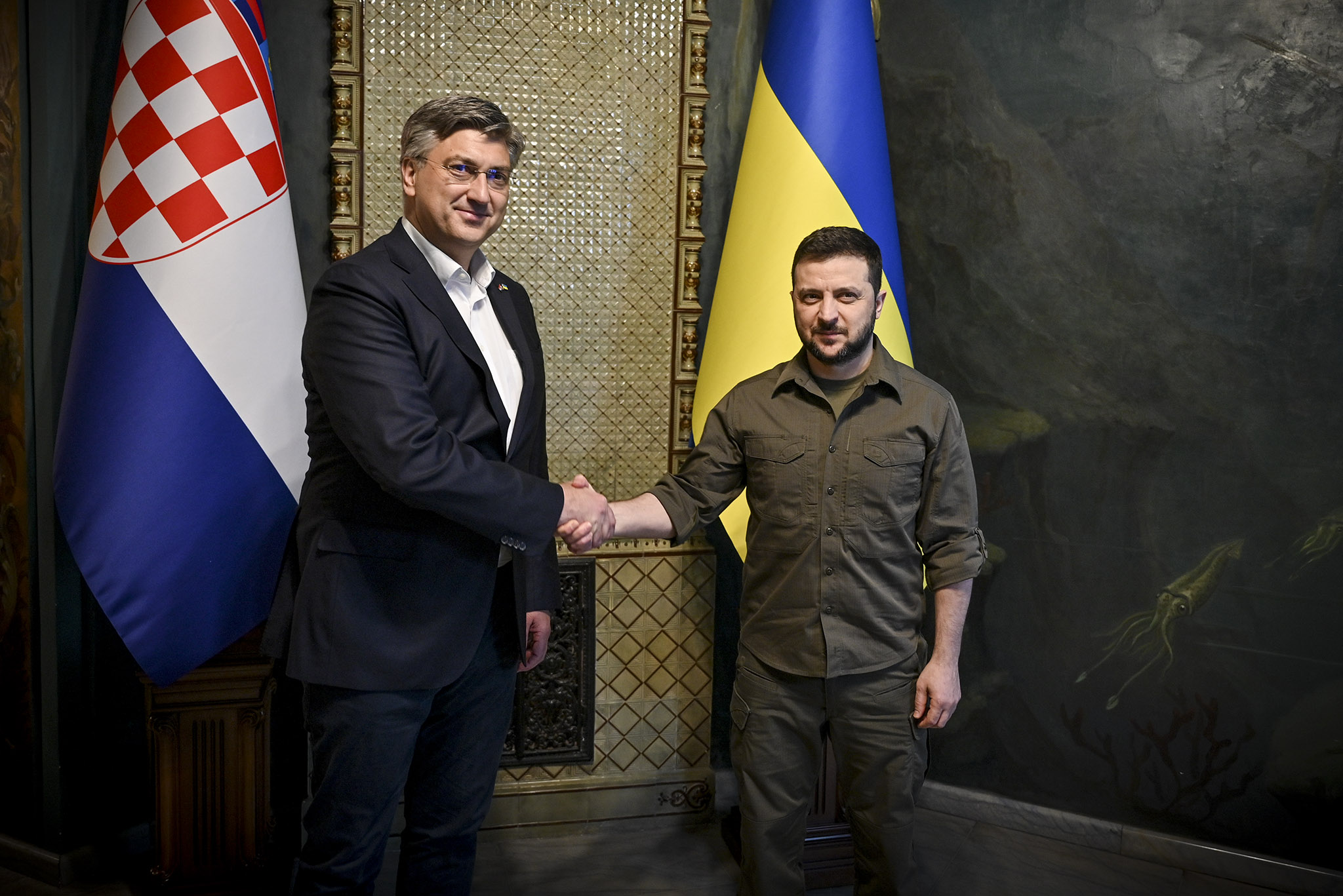
Croatian Prime Minister Andrej Plenković with Ukrainian President Volodymyr Zelenskyy in Kyiv, 8 May 2022

Before 1991, both Croatia and Ukraine were part of multinational socialist states, SFR Yugoslavia and Soviet Union. Croatia declared independence from Yugoslavia on 25 June 1991, but considering a three-month moratorium on the decision urged by the European Community, it put into effect on 8 October 1991. Ukraine proclaimed independence from the Soviet Union on 24 August 1991 and recognized Croatia on 11 December 1991 as the first United Nations member state which did it. Diplomatic relations between two countries were established on 18 February 1992.

Since the beginning of Russian invasion of Ukraine, Croatia has drawn on its historical experience with the United Nations Transitional Administration for Eastern Slavonia, Baranja and Western Sirmium to offer insights to Ukraine on peaceful conflict resolution and post-conflict reintegration, highlighting it as a model for managing territorial and ethnic disputes. Holodomor was recognized as genocide of the Ukrainian people by the Government of Croatia on June 15, 2023 with the Croatian Parliament adopting a declaration about the recognition on June 28, 2023.

On 11 June 2025, Plenković and Zelenskyy had a meeting in which Croatia agreed to apply further sanctions on Russia and to increase bilateral cooperation, as well as Plenković explaining that the "ultimatum style" claims of the Russian Federation are unacceptable, and that more pressure should be put on Russia for an overall end to the war.

== Diaspora ==
=== Ukrainians in Croatia ===
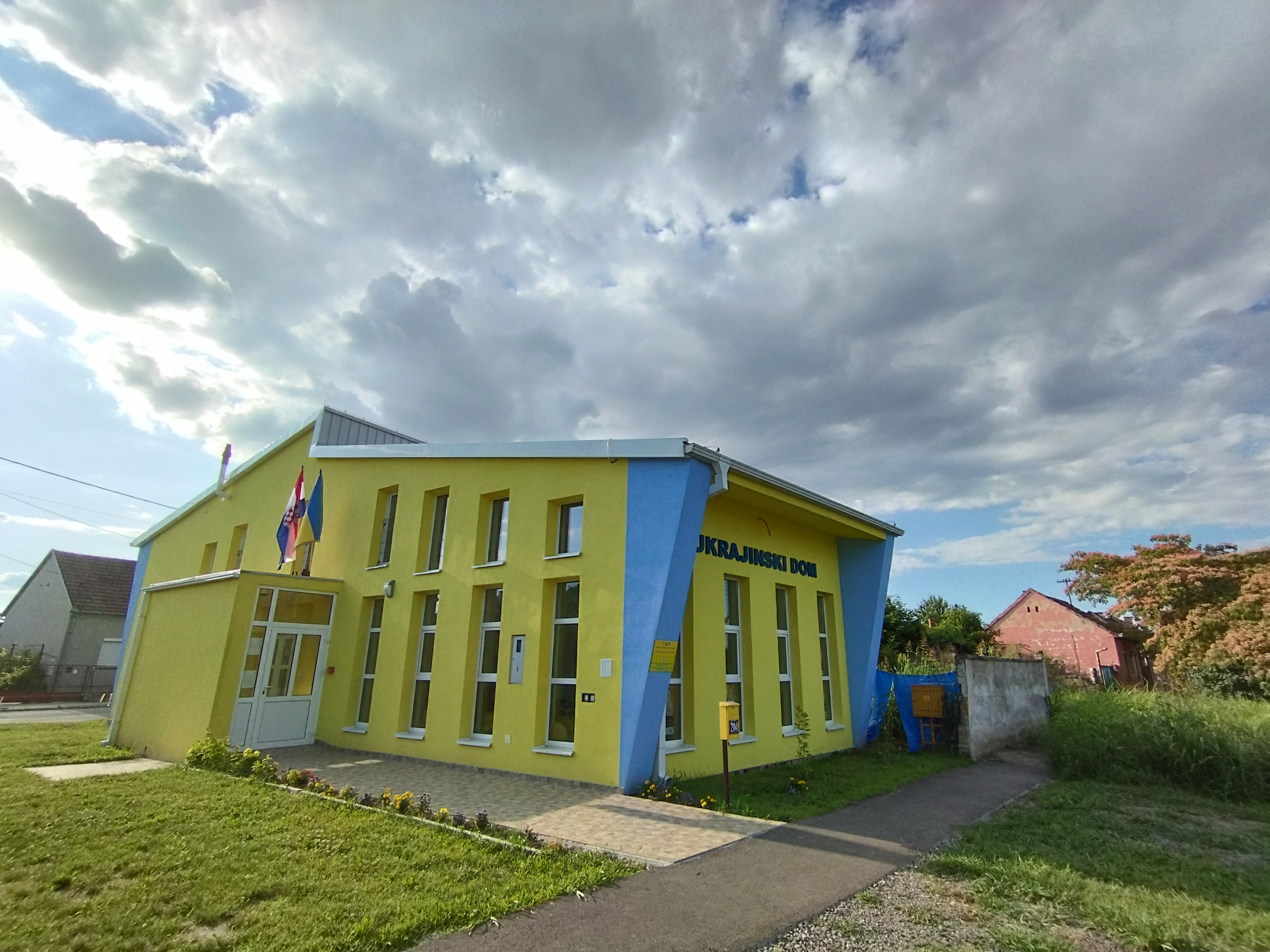
The Ukrainian Home in Vukovar.

As of the 2011 Croatian census, there were 1,878 Ukrainians and 1,936 Rusyns living in Croatia. Ukrainians and Rusyns of Croatia have opened two main cultural and educational organizations in Slavonski Brod and Vukovar, which later expanded into ten smaller communities each, presently operating in various Croatian cities including Zagreb and Rijeka. Croatia strives to meet the needs of the minorities and promote friendly ties between the two nations, having a central library in Zagreb since 1995, a cathedra for Ukrainian language and literature at the University of Zagreb since 2001, and classes provided in the Ukrainian language. Various dates of importance to Ukrainian history, holidays and manifestations are commemorated every year.

=== Croats in Ukraine ===
As of the 2001 Ukrainian census, there were 126 Croats living in Ukraine.

== Resident diplomatic missions ==
- Croatia has an embassy in Kyiv.
- Ukraine has an embassy in Zagreb.
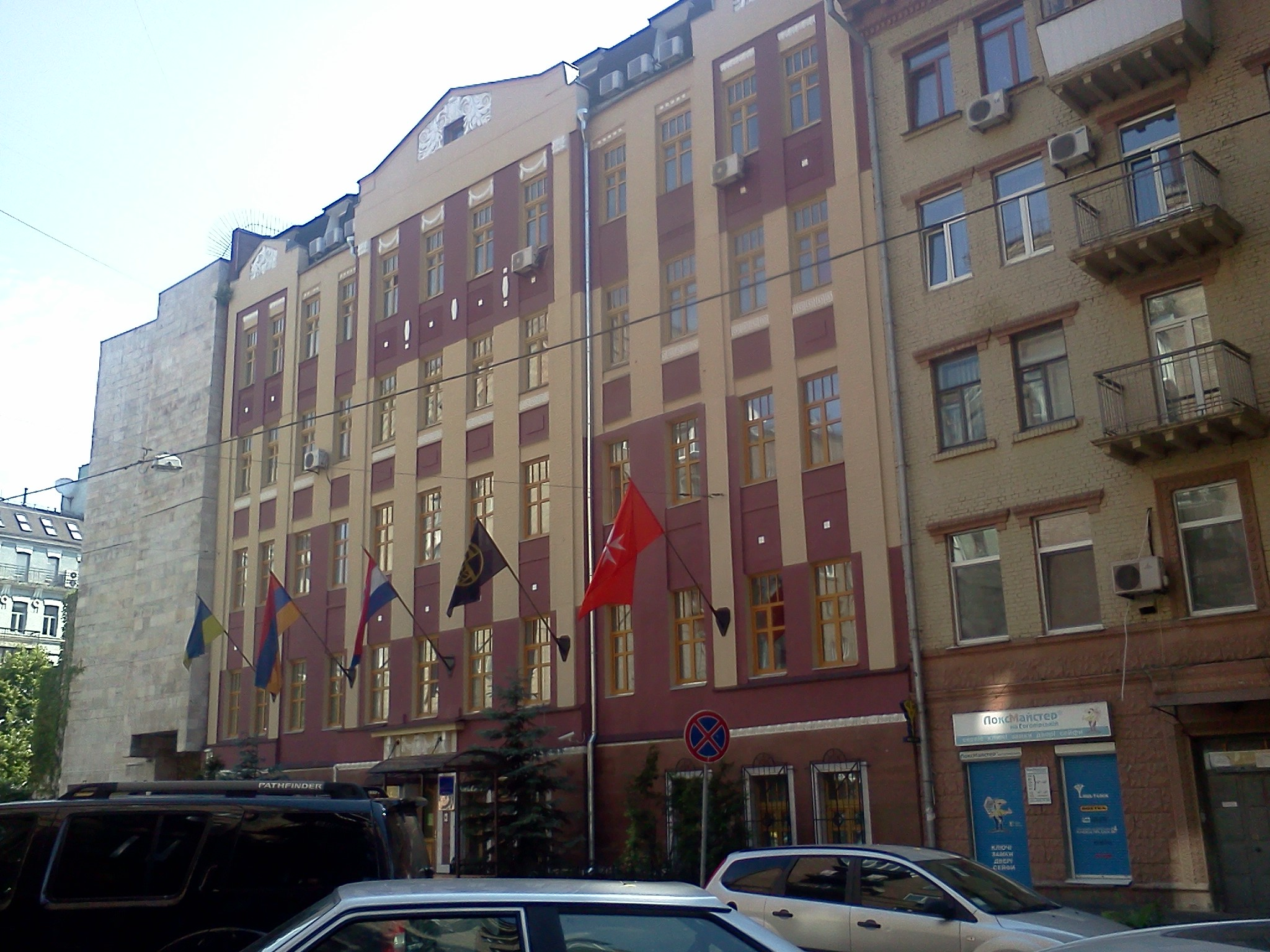
Embassy of Croatia in Kyiv

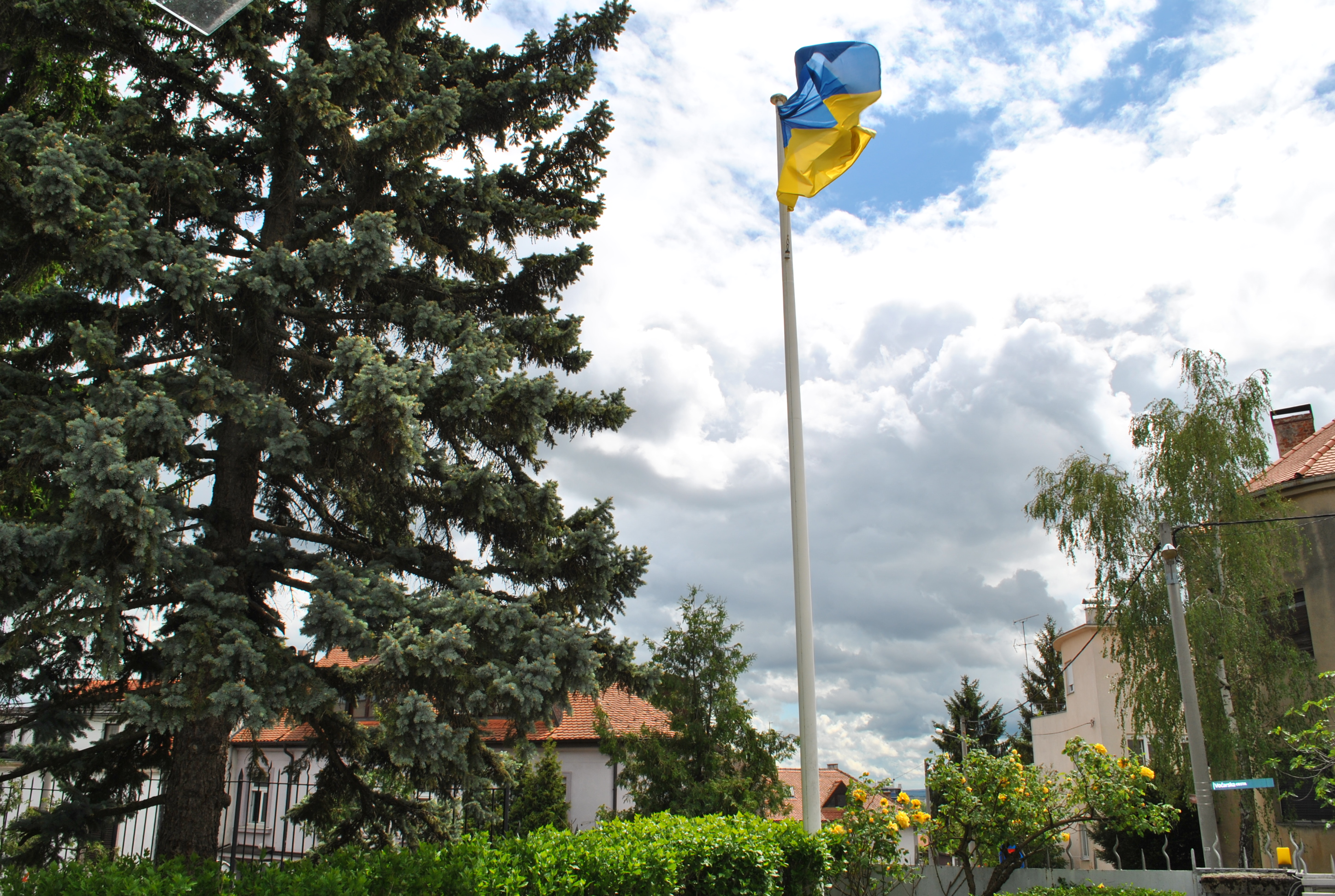
Embassy of Ukraine in Zagreb

== See also ==
- Foreign relations of Croatia
- Foreign relations of Ukraine
- Ukraine-NATO relations
- Ukraine-EU relations
  - Accession of Ukraine to the EU
- Croatian War of Independence
- Russo-Ukrainian War
  - Influence of the Russo-Ukrainian War on Croatia
- Soviet Union–Yugoslavia relations
- Ukrainians in Croatia
