= Croatia and the Russo-Ukrainian war =

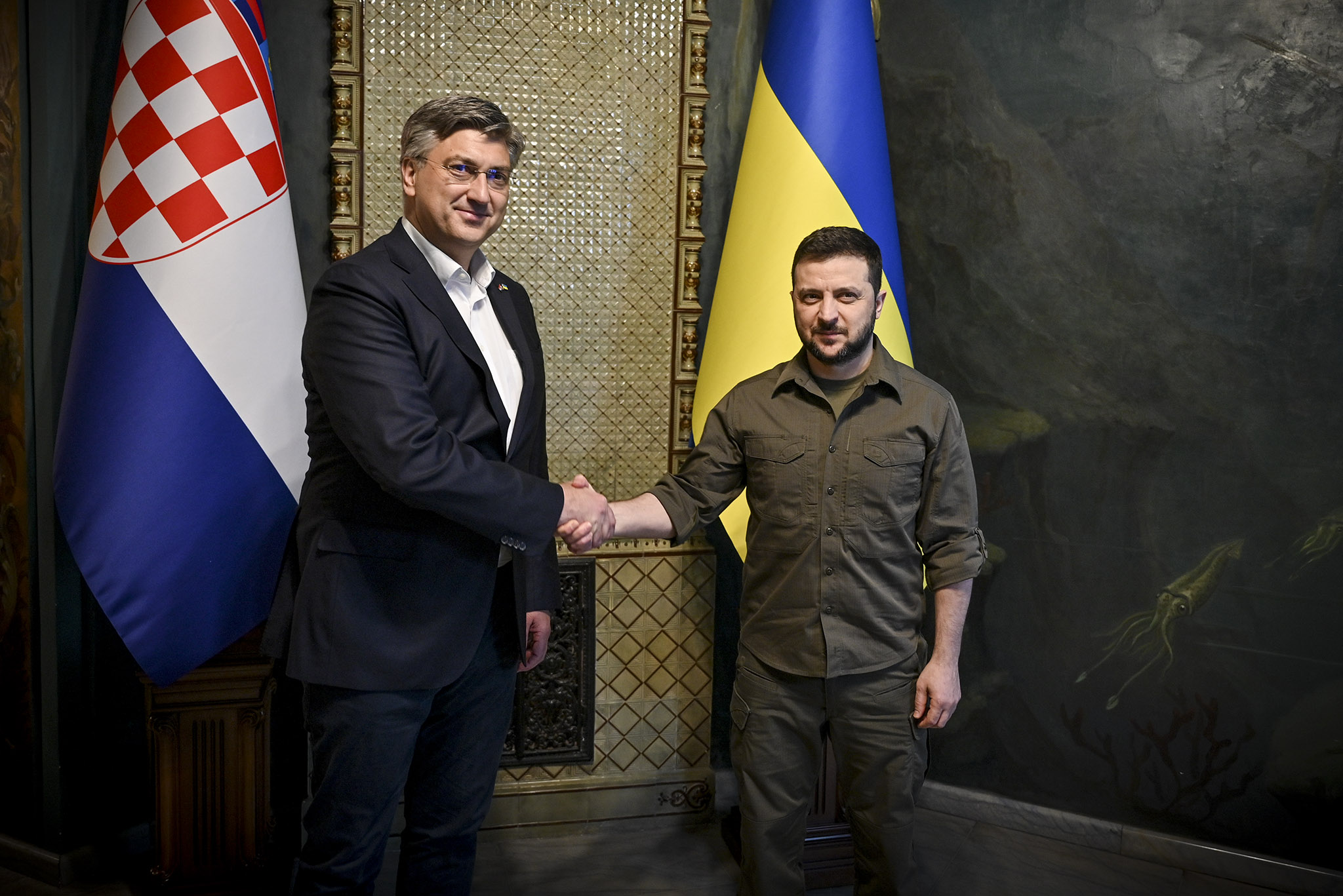
Croatian Prime Minister Andrej Plenković with Ukraine President Volodymyr Zelenskyy visiting Kyiv in May 2022

Croatia has maintained diplomatic relations with Russia and with Ukraine since 1992. The start of the Russo-Ukrainian war in 2014 complicated trilateral affairs between the three nations in Europe. The armed conflict destabilized Eastern Europe which strained Croatian supply chains, international security, and economic resiliency in Southeast Europe. The energy sector in Croatia was negatively impacted; the nation subsequently halted Russian oil and gas imports by 2025.

The Croatian government and public have largely supported Ukraine in the conflict, with protests against the war and sanctions against Russia. Croatia has sent both defence and economic aid to Ukraine. It provided over €300 million in military aid to Ukraine as part of broader efforts within NATO by 2026. The Russian invasion of Ukraine and Zagreb Tu-141 drone crash in 2022 catalyzed broader Croatian military rearmament.

== Political reaction ==
The Croatian political scene was initially divided in regard to Russia's invasion of Ukraine. Republic of Croatia's Government led by prime minister Andrej Plenković expressed its full support to Ukraine, which Plenković himself emphasized several times in his statements. In May 2022, Plenković visited Ukrainian president Volodymyr Zelenskyy in Kyiv. On 25 February 2022, the Croatian Parliament adopted the Declaration on Ukraine, with 133 votes in favour and one vote abstaining. The declaration "sharply condemns unprovoked Russian aggression on sovereignty, territorial integrity and independence of Ukraine". The only MP who abstained from voting in favour was Katarina Peović of the Workers' Front, claiming that this declaration "militarizes Croatian society". Croatian parliamentarian Domagoj Hajduković of the Social Democrats also expressed his support for Ukraine by protesting in front of Russian Embassy in Zagreb on 25 May 2022.

Krešo Beljak, of the Croatian Peasant Party, considers that "both Russia and USA run the imperialist war in Ukraine at the expense of poor Ukrainians". He also criticized Zelenskyy for "only asking for weapons, not humanitarian aid", or a "ceasefire". In one of his speeches in Croatian parliament he also said that: "in Ukraine, USA is waging a war against Russia up until a final Ukrainian" [is alive]. President of Croatia Zoran Milanović expressed mostly opinions which favoured Russia, although he himself was saying that he is: "neither Ukrainian enemy, nor Russian friend". Milanović was commended in Russian media because of his statements, while at the same time he ended on a black list of Ukrainian website Myrotvorets. Milanović even provoked a furious reaction from the Ukrainian Ministry of Foreign Affairs, which summoned the Croatian ambassador in Kyiv on consultations due to Milanović's statements. Prime Minister Plenković apologised to Ukrainians for Milanović's statements. When Politico wrote about possibility of Ukrainian troops being trained in the EU including in Croatia, Milanović was first to rise up against it. He said that he would block any initiative where Ukrainians would receive military training in Croatia. In a response to that, Milanović again became a "star" of the Russian media, with Russian state-owned news agency TASS for example quoting Milanović's statement that "NATO is a warring party in Ukraine". On 21 October 2024, Russian news site Vzglyad called Milanović: "a main Russian agent in EU who does not get enough credit" and described him as a man who "skillfuly used his limited authorities to put obstacles before NATO adventures related to Ukraine".

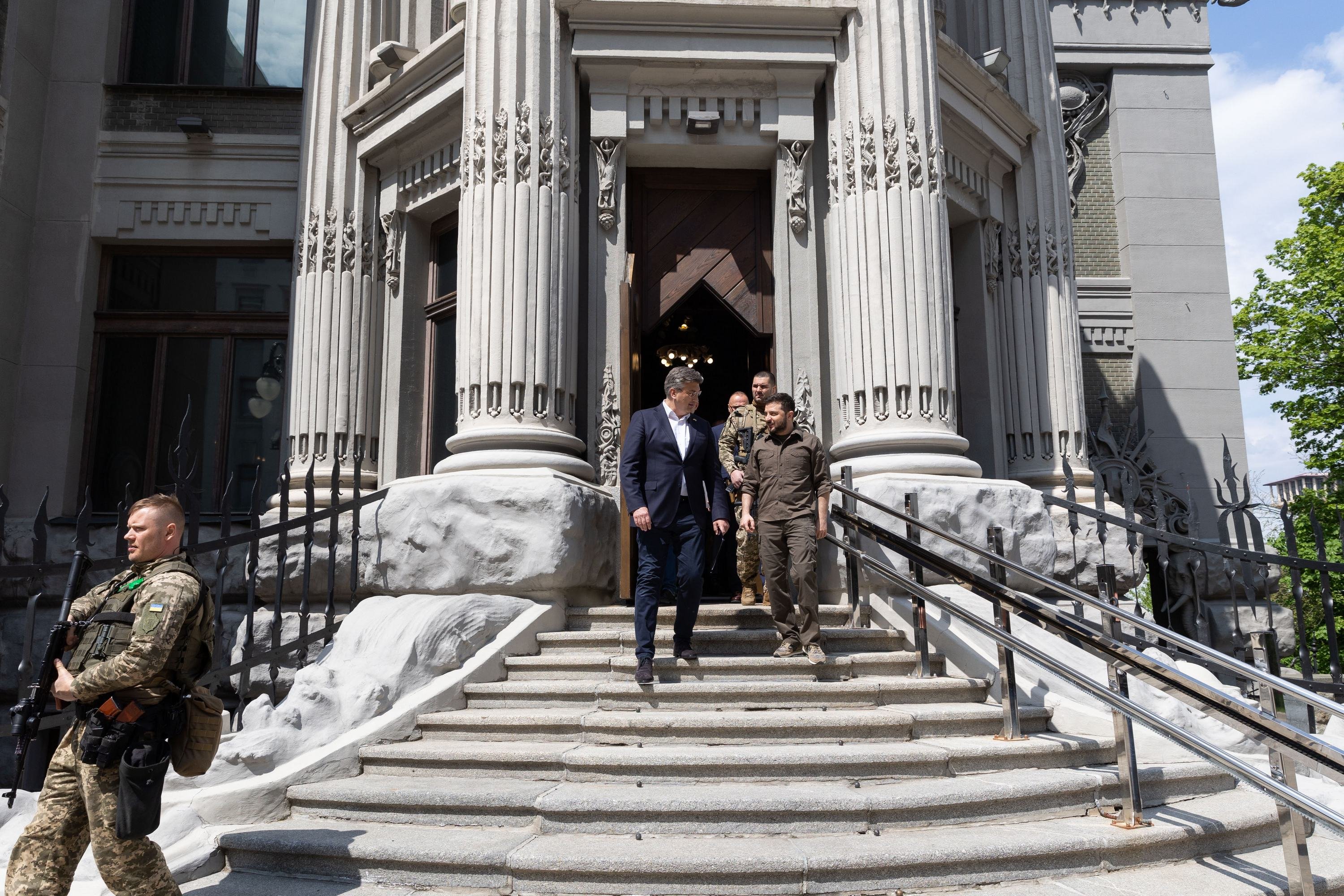
Prime minister Plenković visiting Kyiv in May 2022

Retired admiral Davor Domazet Lošo expressed opinions aligned with the Russian interpretation of the war, claiming that the war in Ukraine is a clash between "Christ and Antichrist" where Collective west plays the role of an Antichrist". This will surely make Putin a winner, claimed Domazet. He also stated that, "The Ukrainian language is a dialect of the Russian language" and that "Kyiv never was a Ukrainian city". Pro-Russian opinions on the war were also expressed by former members of the populist, Eurosceptic former political party Živi zid. Former member of this party Ivan Vilibor Sinčić complained against the Croatian government's decision to grant 3500 HRK of financial aid to Ukrainian refugees. Former Živi zid member Branimir Bunjac also expressed his support to Russia on social networks. Ivan Pernar was one of the largest supporters of the Russian invasion of Ukraine, and he used his Telegram channel to spread Russian propaganda.

=== Diplomatic reactions from Moscow ===
- On 16 March 2022, Yuri Pilipson, a deputy of the Russian Ministry of Foreign Affairs in charge of south-eastern Europe, criticized Croatia and Slovenia for providing military aid to Ukraine.
- After Croatia expelled 11 Russian diplomats and 6 members of administration, Russia responded by expelling 5 diplomats from the Croatian embassy in Moscow.
- On 25 April 2022, Russian Ministry of Foreign Affairs spokesperson Maria Zakharova verbally attacked Croatia for denying the right to Russian diplomats to leave Croatia via airplane. Zakharova stated that Croatia, "systematically and intentionally develops an anti-Russian line and [..] downgrades itself to the level of conspiring".
- On 22 July 2022, the Kremlin announced that Croatia was added to the "List of enemy countries of Russia", along with Greece, Denmark, Slovakia and Slovenia.

Following illegal Russian referendums and annexations of four Ukrainian regions, partially occupied by the Russian Army, Andrej Nestorenko, Russian ambassador to Croatia was summoned to Ministry of Foreign and European Affairs in Zagreb. While there, the ministry expressed official protests due to the illegal annexation and threats of using nuclear weapons. Croatia demanded reversal of the annexation and withdrawal of the Russian army and military equipment from the entire territory of Ukraine.

=== Zagreb Crimean Platform Summit ===
In October 2022, Croatian capital Zagreb hosted the 1st Parliamentary Summit of the International Crimea Platform. The summit was attended by representatives of 32 states, while 11 more participated in the summit via videolink. Croatian president Zoran Milanović did not attend the summit, and apparently even refused to meet with American politician Nancy Pelosi, for which he was again hailed in Russian media. Two days after the summit, Chairman of the Verkhovna Rada, Ruslan Stefanchuk, held a speech in the Croatian Sabor, in which he compared the Ukrainian struggle during the Russian invasion of Ukraine, with the Croatian struggle in the Croatian War of Independence. After his speech, a Ukrainian folklore ensemble held a performance in the Sabor.

=== 2024 Ukraine – South East Europe Dubrovnik Summit ===
On 9 October 2024, the Croatian town of Dubrovnik hosted the Ukraine - South East Europe Summit, which was attended by president of Ukraine Volodymyr Zelenskyy. According to writing of the Croatian daily Novi list, president Milanović was not invited at the request of president Zelenskyy. Given the fact that the same summit was attended by Serbian president Aleksandar Vučić, Plenković's government was fiercely criticized by the opposition in Sabor. Plenković, in turn, responded that Milanović was not supposed to be invited to the summit, and accused Milanović of spreading pro-Russian sentiment among the Croatian public. Members of Croatian Democratic Union then accused president Milanović of being funded by the Russians, which was denied by the Security and Intelligence Agency of Croatia.

=== Croatian participation in NSATU mission ===
Although Plenković's government wanted for Croatia to join the NSATU mission, contributing by 2 officers from the Croatian Armed Forces, Milanović supported by opposition parties opposed this initiative, under the pretext that Plenković was trying to drag the country into the Ukrainian war. Before the vote in the Croatian parliament on the initiative, Sabor was supposed to hold its Defence Committee session where the Defence Minister was supposed to explain to the parliament all aspects of this mission. However, Milanović, as supreme commander of the Croatian Armed Forces used his legal authorities to forbid the Chief-of-Staff of the Croatian Army Thomir Kundid from participating in the meeting and even protested against the session being open to the public.

== Public opinion ==
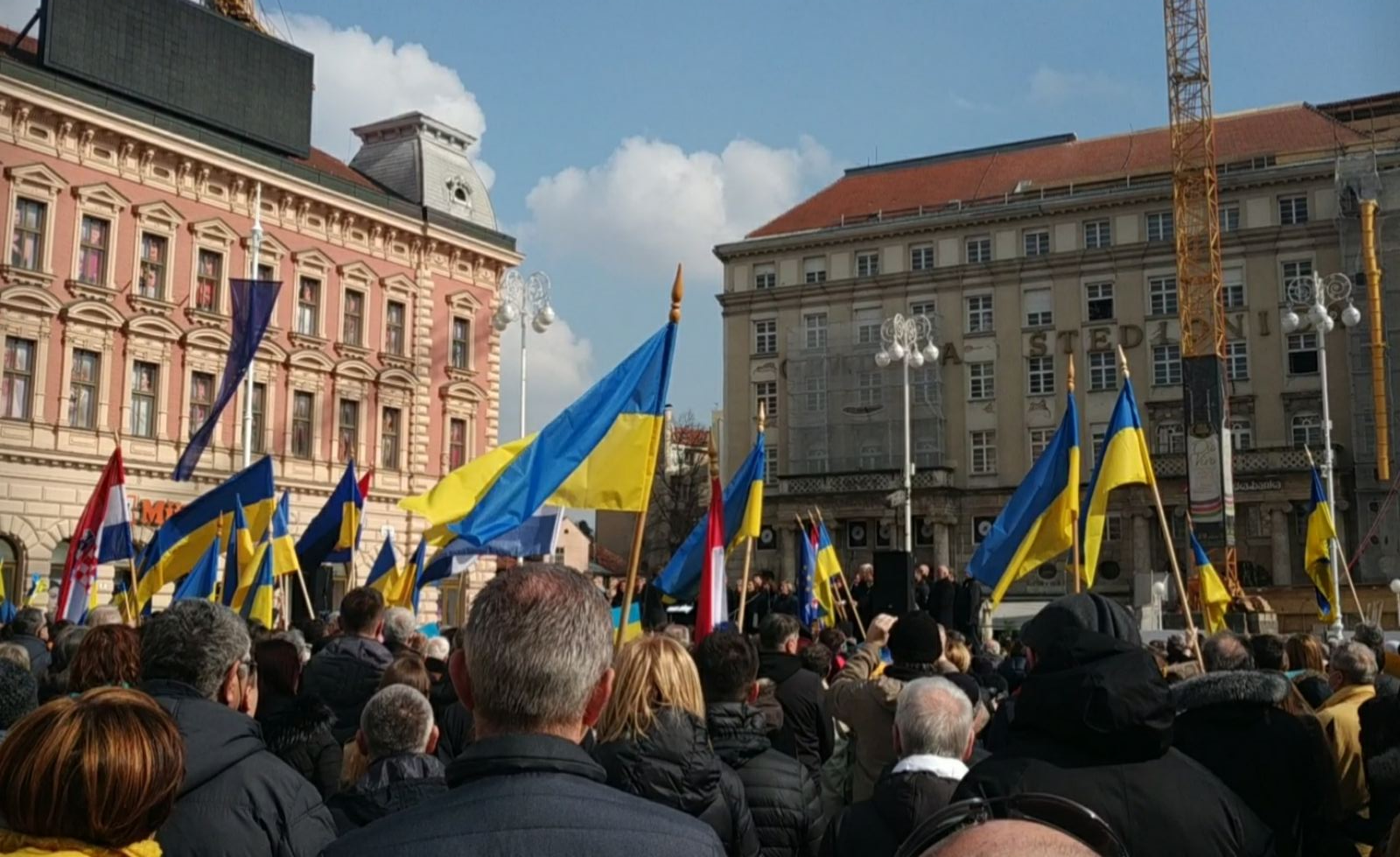
Protest against 2022 Russian invasion of Ukraine, held on 5 March 2022 on Ban Jelačić Square in Zagreb

According to the poll conducted in March 2022 on behalf of Croatian RTL television, 58.1% of Croatian citizens consider Russia and its president Putin responsible for the 2022 Invasion of Ukraine. 26.3% of Croatian citizens consider both Russia and the US equally responsible for the war. 5.8% of Croatian citizens considers the United States solely responsible for war in Ukraine. Remaining citizens (8.8%) considers Ukraine, United States, NATO, or European Union in some combination to be responsible for the war. Another poll, conducted on 15 March 2022, showed similar results.

At the beginning of the Russian invasion, protests against the invasion and in support of Ukraine were held in several Croatian cities. On 5 March 2022, a protest in support of Ukraine was held in Zagreb. According to Croatian daily Jutarnji list, the protest was attended by several thousand Zagreb citizens. Notable people attending the protest included Croatian education minister Radovan Fuchs, president of the Croatian Helsinki Committee Ivan Zvonimir Čičak, European parliamentarian Tonino Picula, and French ambassador to Croatia Gaël Veyssière. Similar protest in support of Ukraine was also organised in second largest Croatian city of Split. The city mayor Ivica Puljak and county prefect Blaženko Boban also participated in the protest. More protest in support of Ukraine were held in Vukovar and Slavonski Brod. In Slavonski Brod some young woman attacked the protesters by yelling: "What does [Slavonski] Brod have from Ukraine!?", before she was taken away by the police. Another protest in support of Ukraine was also held in front of Faculty of Humanities and Social Sciences in Zagreb on 5 April 2022.

During the Battle of Mariupol, Russians captured Croatian citizen Vjekoslav Prebeg who was a member of the Ukrainian Marines. He ended up on being put on trial by officials of the Donetsk People's Republic, along with Brits and Swedes who were also captured. The separatist court accused them of being foreign mercenaries. On 21 September 2022, Prebeg and remaining captives were released from Russian captivity through Saudi Arabian mediation. In June 2022 yet another Croatian citizen returned to Croatia after he was badly wounded while fighting for Ukrainians near Kharkiv.

On 16 September 2022, Croatian 29-year-old humanitarian Andro Fabijanić was killed in Ukraine by an anti-tank mine blast. Croatian media published that until 21 June 2022, Republic of Croatia had housed 20,005 Ukrainian refugees.

Since March 2022, Croatian Railways provide free transportation for Ukrainian citizens on all routes in the internal railway traffic of Croatia.

Grad Zagreb provided summer vacation for Ukrainian children.

More than 400 Ukrainians sheltered in Croatia finished free Croatian language course provided by the Caritas of the Archdiocese of Rijeka and led by lecturers at Faculty of Humanities of the University of Rijeka.

Croatian war veterans' diving club ”Nemo-Adriatic”, in cooperation with UNBROKEN Foundation from Lviv and the Croatian Ministry of Foreign Affairs operates resocialization project for Ukrainian soldiers with education, workshops and sports activities.

== National security ==
Croatian Security and Intelligence Agency in its annual report published in 2023, accused Russian intelligence services for the majority of state-sponsored cyberattacks launched on Croatian institutions in previous year, claiming that majority of these were directed towards the Croatian Ministry of Defence and the Ministry of Foreign and European Affairs. According to the same report, since the start of the Russian invasion of Ukraine, the Russian cyber attacks also intensified, 19 of which happened between 2022 and 2023. In April 2022, 18 Russian diplomats and other 6 members of Russian Embassy in Zagreb were ordered to leave Croatia for engaging in illegal intelligence gathering.

== Military activity ==
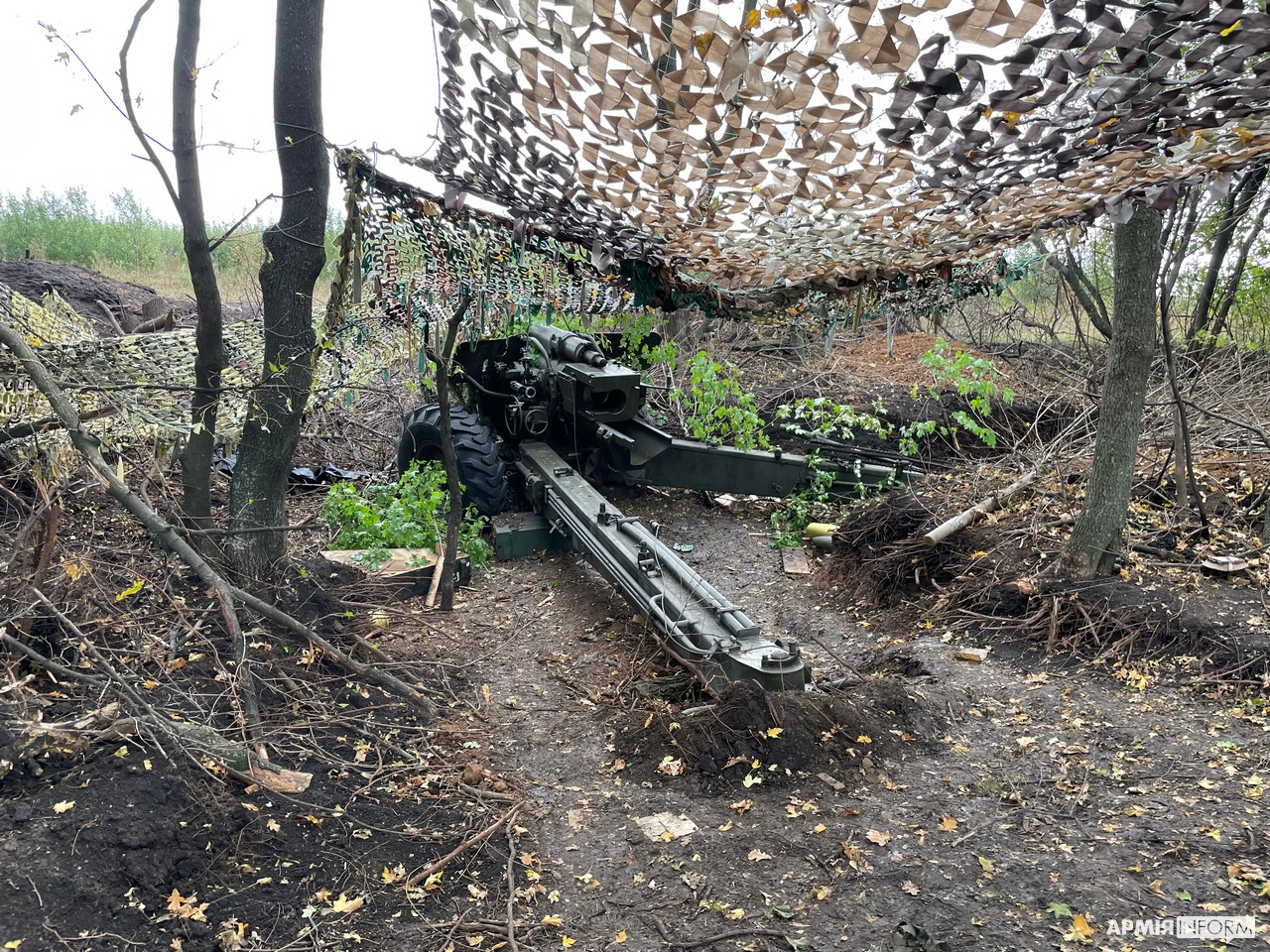
Croatian M-46 field guns in firing position, in Donetsk Oblast, 2022

On 10 March 2022, an unmanned aerial vehicle of unknown origin crashed in Zagreb, which most likely flew all the way from Ukraine. In early March 2022, Croatian media published that Croatia was sending military aid to Ukraine worth 16.5 million Euros. The aid in form of protective gear and small arms dispatched to Ukraine was apparently sufficient to equip four infantry brigades. On 4 March 2022, the Croatian military attaché in Moscow Željko Akrap was summoned to Russian Defence Ministry where Russians attempted to hand him a protest note, claiming that Croatian citizen Denis Šeler "brought 200 foreign mercenaries from Croatia" to fight for Ukraine. Akrap refused to take this note. Denis Šeler, whom the Russians accused, on the same day gave a statement to Croatian media denying the Russian accusations and saying that: "this clearly shows that Russians are desperate".

On 15 August 2022, news site Shepard Media wrote that Croatia donated at least fifteen M-46 field guns to Ukraine. On 20 September 2022, photographs of these guns taken in the Donbas appeared on Twitter, as well as ammunition crates with markings in the Croatian language.

In March 2023, it was announced that Croatia would donate 14 Mi-8 military transport helicopters to Ukraine. According to words of Ukrainian defence minister Oleksii Reznikov, Croatia had previously donated Ukraine 5-10 shipments of its MANPADS systems Strijela and Igla, D-30 howitzers, various AK variants, 5000 FN FAL battle rifles, anti-tank weapons, protective gear etc. On 7 May 2023, Croatian daily Večernji list wrote that Croatian volunteers from the restored Azov Regiment participated in Battle of Bakhmut. On 6 June, Slobodna Dalmacija wrote about ex Croatian RAK-12 MRL in service with Ukrainian border guards.

== Economic impact ==
Due to economic sanctions imposed on Russia, the Russian Sberbank ceased its operations in Croatia. Its Croatian subsidiary was taken over by the Croatian state-owned Hrvatska poštanska banka, and rebranded it as Nova hrvatska banka. Due to the Russian invasion, Croatia faced many price increases. According to the Croatian newspaper Poslovni dnevnik, which deals with economic topics, in March 2022, food prices in Croatia reached a record high over the previous 30 years. In early October 2022, Croatia stopped supplying Serbia with Russian crude oil through its Adriatic Pipeline. Although this decision was made on the level of the European Union, Aleksandar Vučić's government in Belgrade blamed Croatia for terminating supply after which people and media close to President Vučić publicly insulted Croatia and its institutions for the next few days by comparing them to the historical far-right Ustaše movement.

== Cultural influence ==
- Croatian submission to 2023 Eurovision Song Contest by band Let 3 called Mama ŠČ is interpreted by some as critique of 2022 Russian invasion of Ukraine.
- On their concert on 25 February 2022, Zagreb Philharmonic Orchestra substituted Tchaikovsky's Capriccio Italien and 4th Symphony with Adagio by Samuel Barber and Beethoven's 7th Symphony.
