= List of diplomatic missions in Croatia =

This article lists diplomatic missions resident in Croatia. At present, the capital city of Zagreb hosts 58 embassies. Several countries have non-resident embassies accredited from other regional capitals, such as Vienna and Rome.

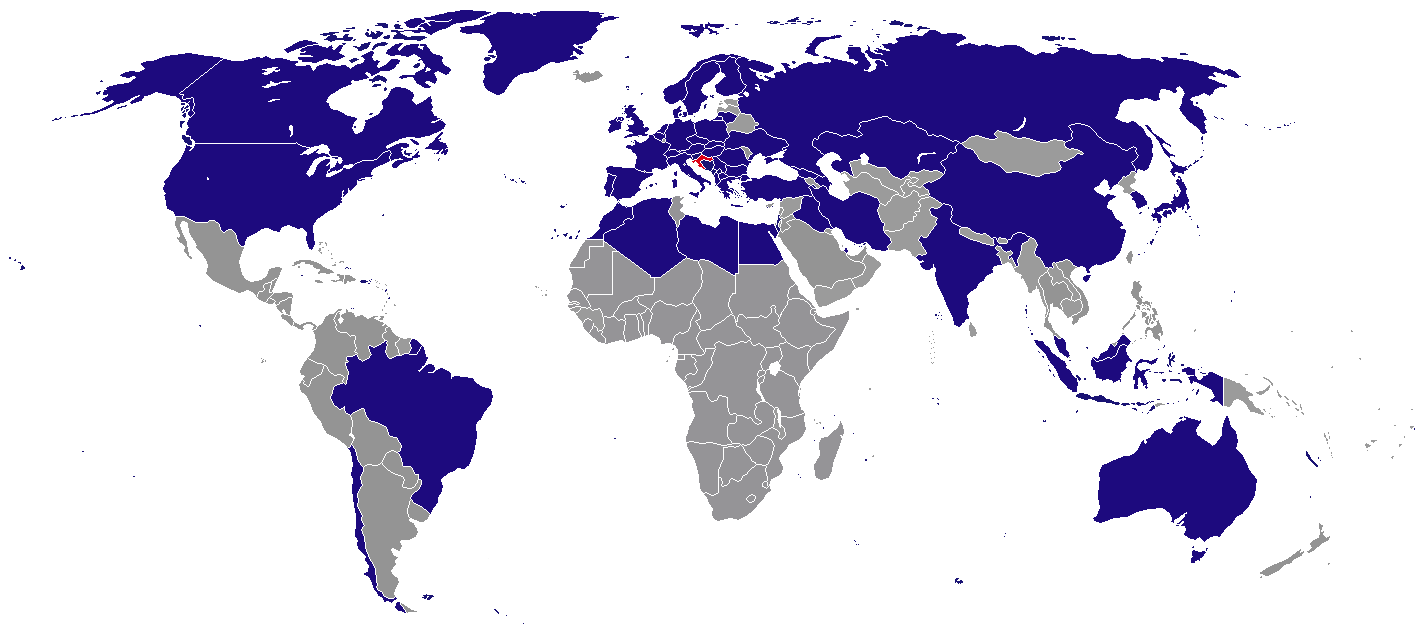
Map of diplomatic missions in Croatia

== Diplomatic missions in Zagreb ==
=== Embassies ===
1. Albania
2. Algeria
3. Australia
4. Austria
5. Azerbaijan
6. Belgium
7. Bosnia and Herzegovina
8. Brazil
9. Bulgaria
10. Canada
11. Chile
12. China
13. Czechia
14. Denmark
15. Egypt
16. Finland
17. France
18. Georgia
19. Germany
20. Greece
21. Holy See
22. Hungary
23. India
24. Indonesia
25. Iran
26. Iraq
27. Ireland
28. Israel
29. Italy
30. Japan
31. Kazakhstan
32. Kosovo
33. Libya
34. Lithuania
35. Malaysia
36. Montenegro
37. Morocco
38. Netherlands
39. North Macedonia
40. Norway
41. Oman
42. Poland
43. Portugal
44. Qatar
45. Romania
46. Russia
47. Serbia
48. Slovakia
49. Slovenia
50. South Korea
51. Sovereign Military Order of Malta
52. Spain
53. Sweden
54. Switzerland
55. Turkey
56. Ukraine
57. United Kingdom
58. United States

=== Other delegations or missions ===
1. Wallonia (Economic & Trade Office)

=== Gallery ===
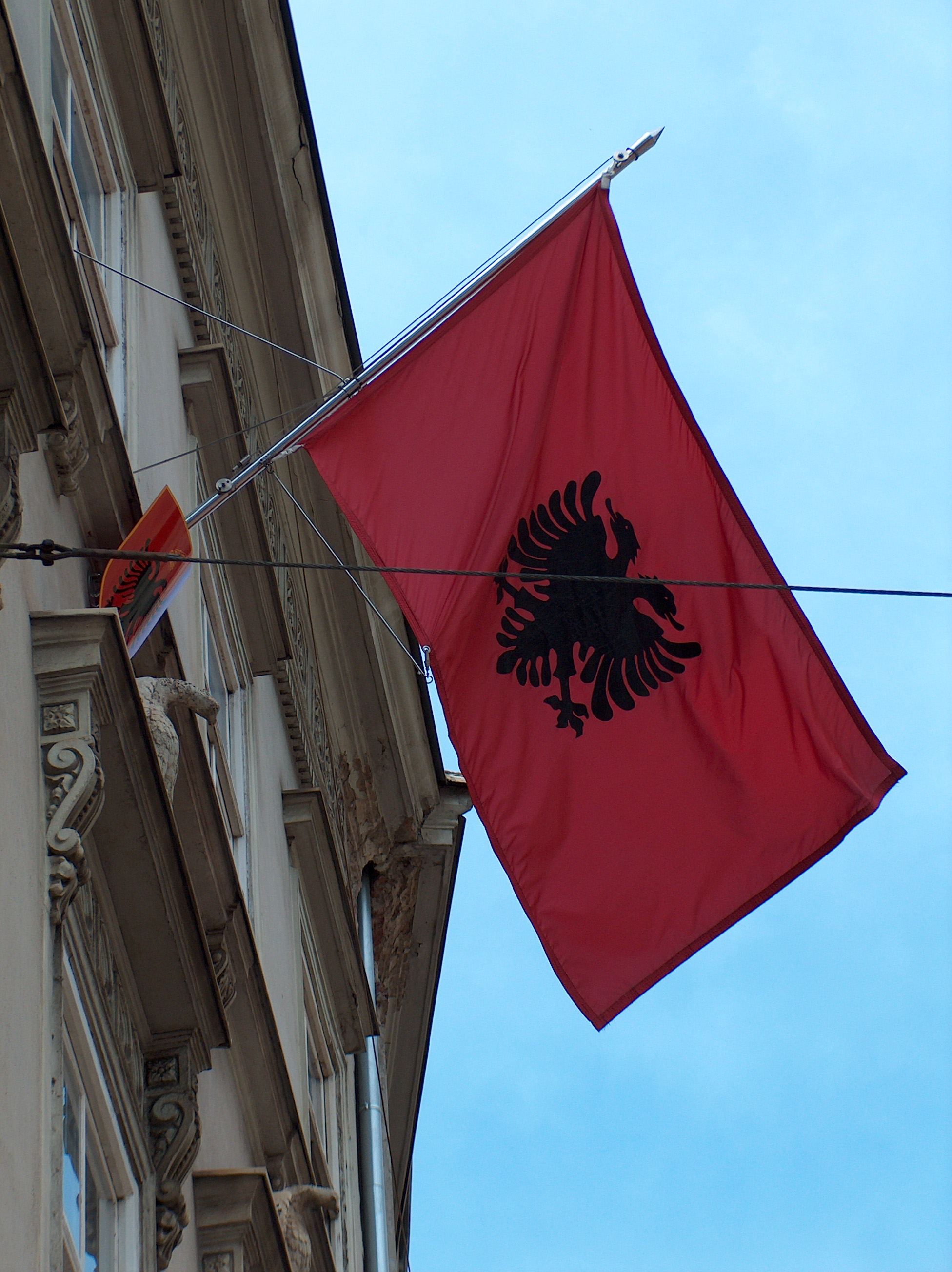
Embassy of Albania

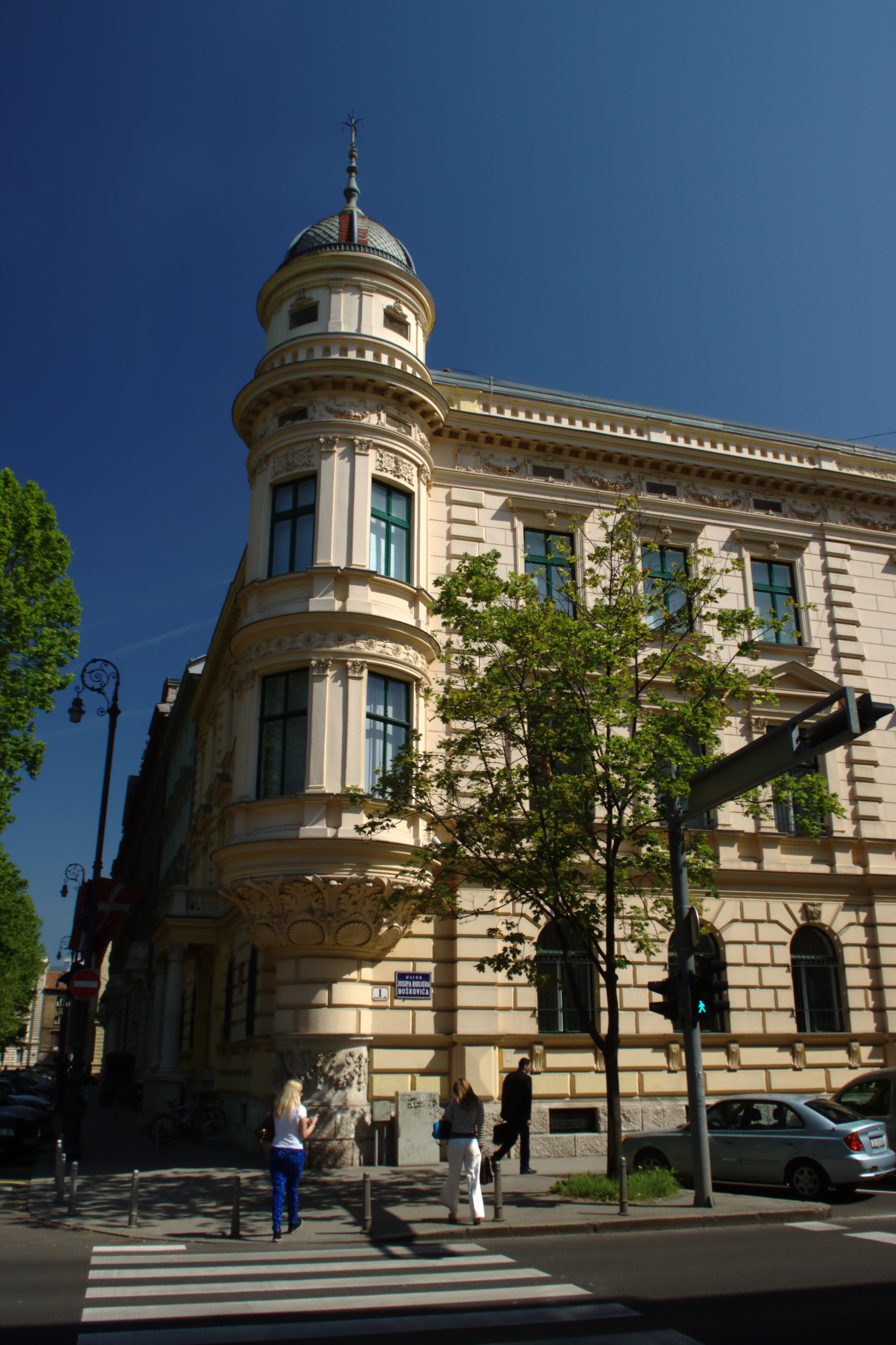
Embassy of Brazil

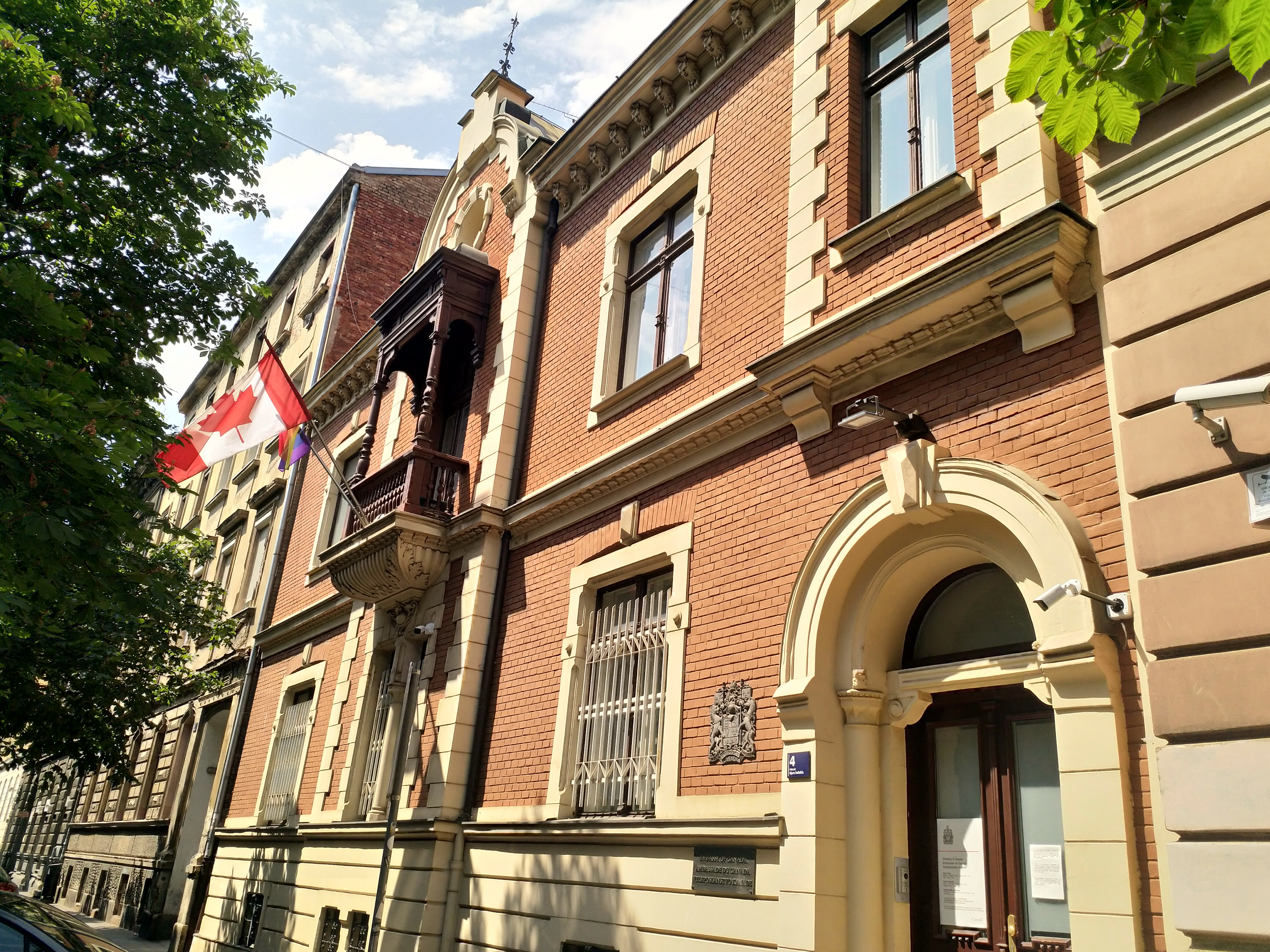
Embassy of Canada

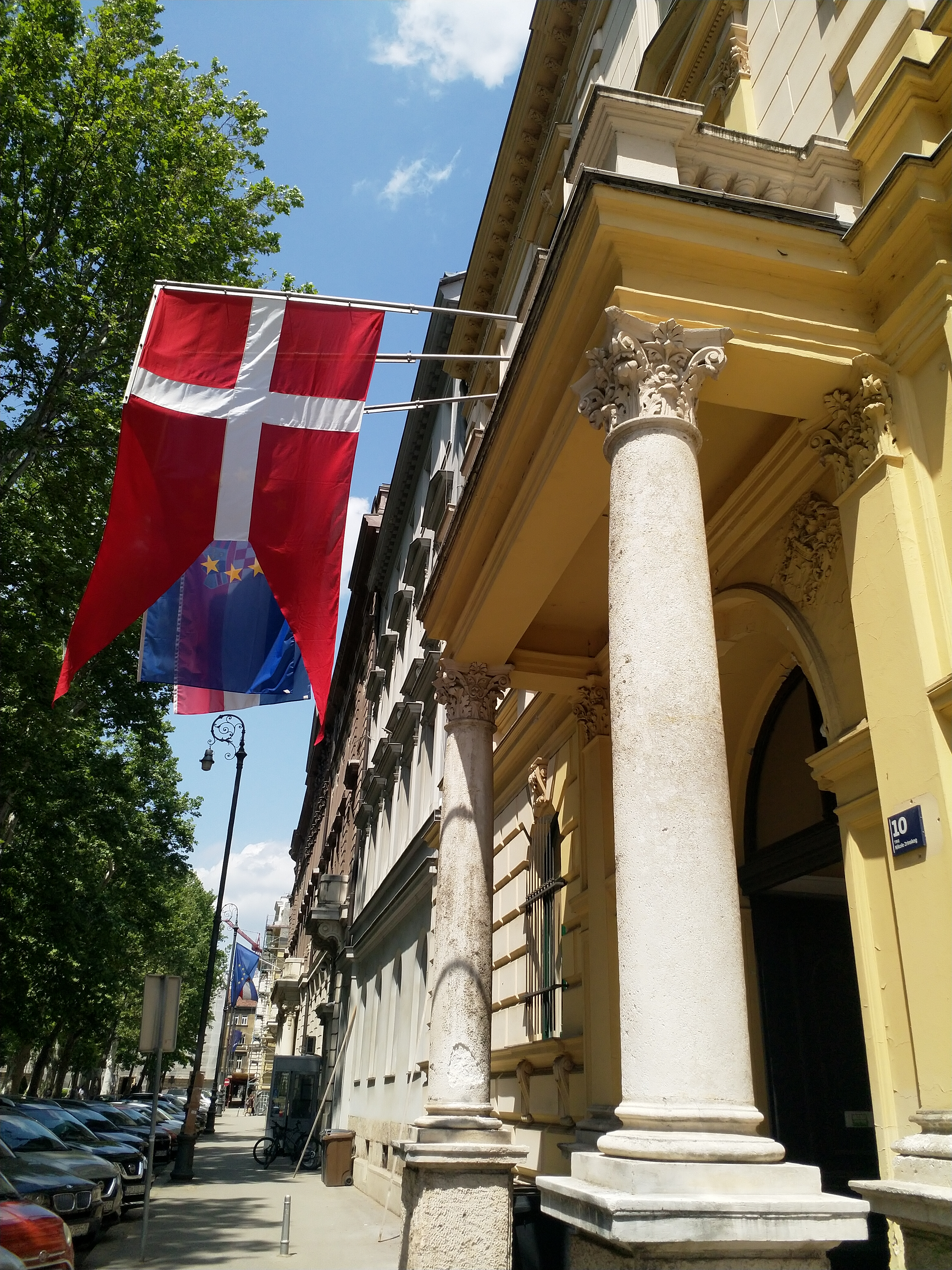
Embassy of Denmark

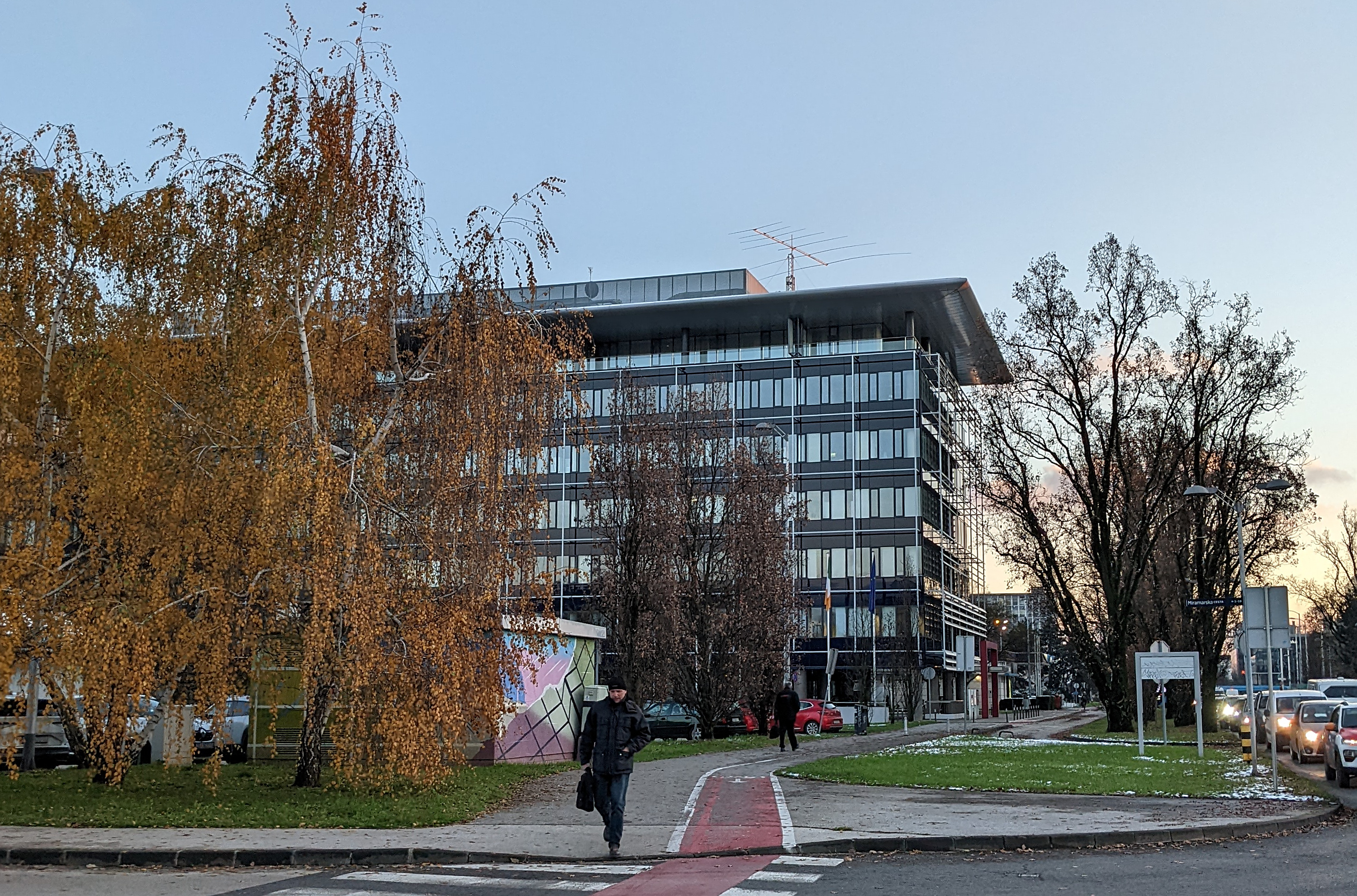
Building hosting the embassies of Finland, Ireland, Netherlands, and Poland

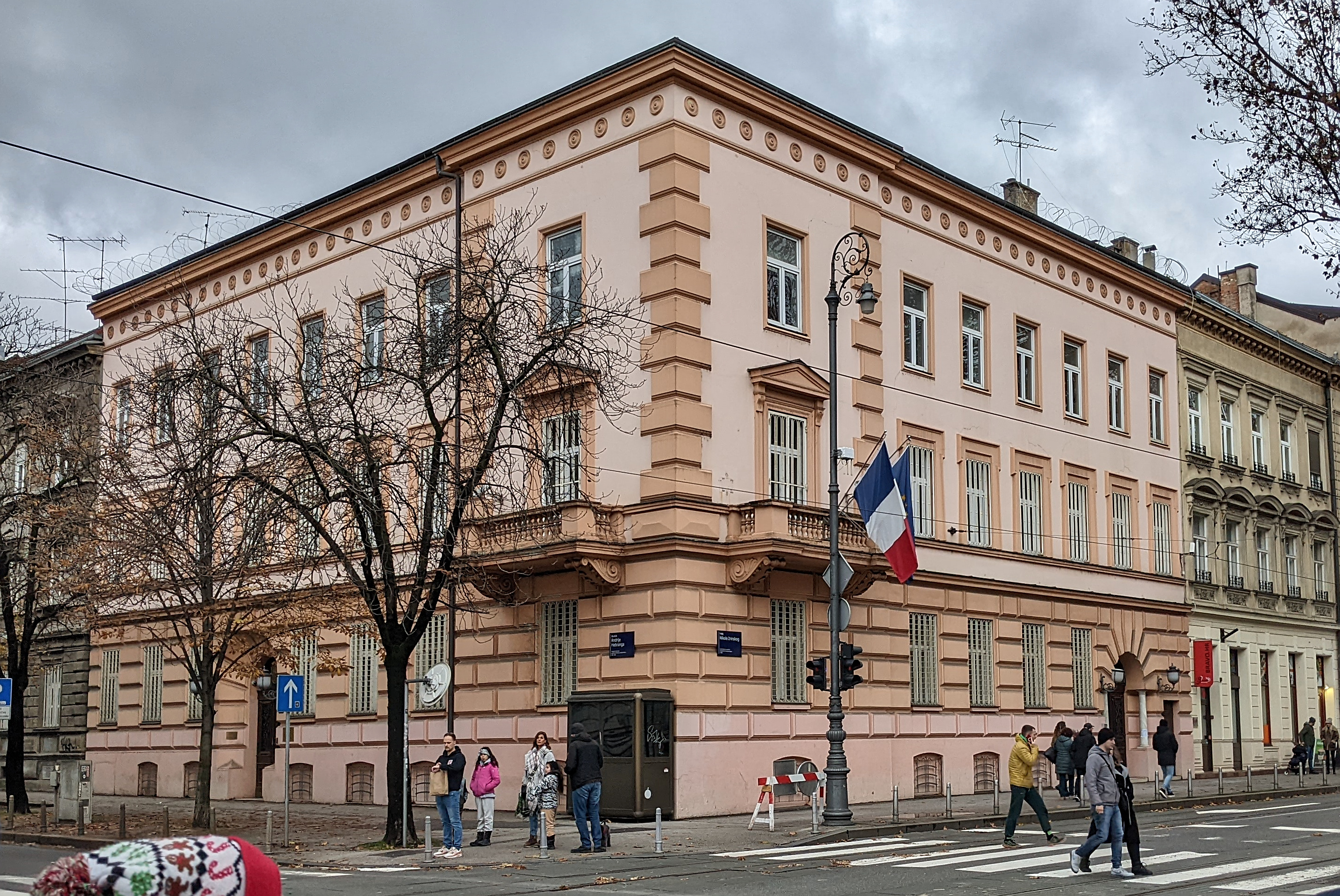
Embassy of France

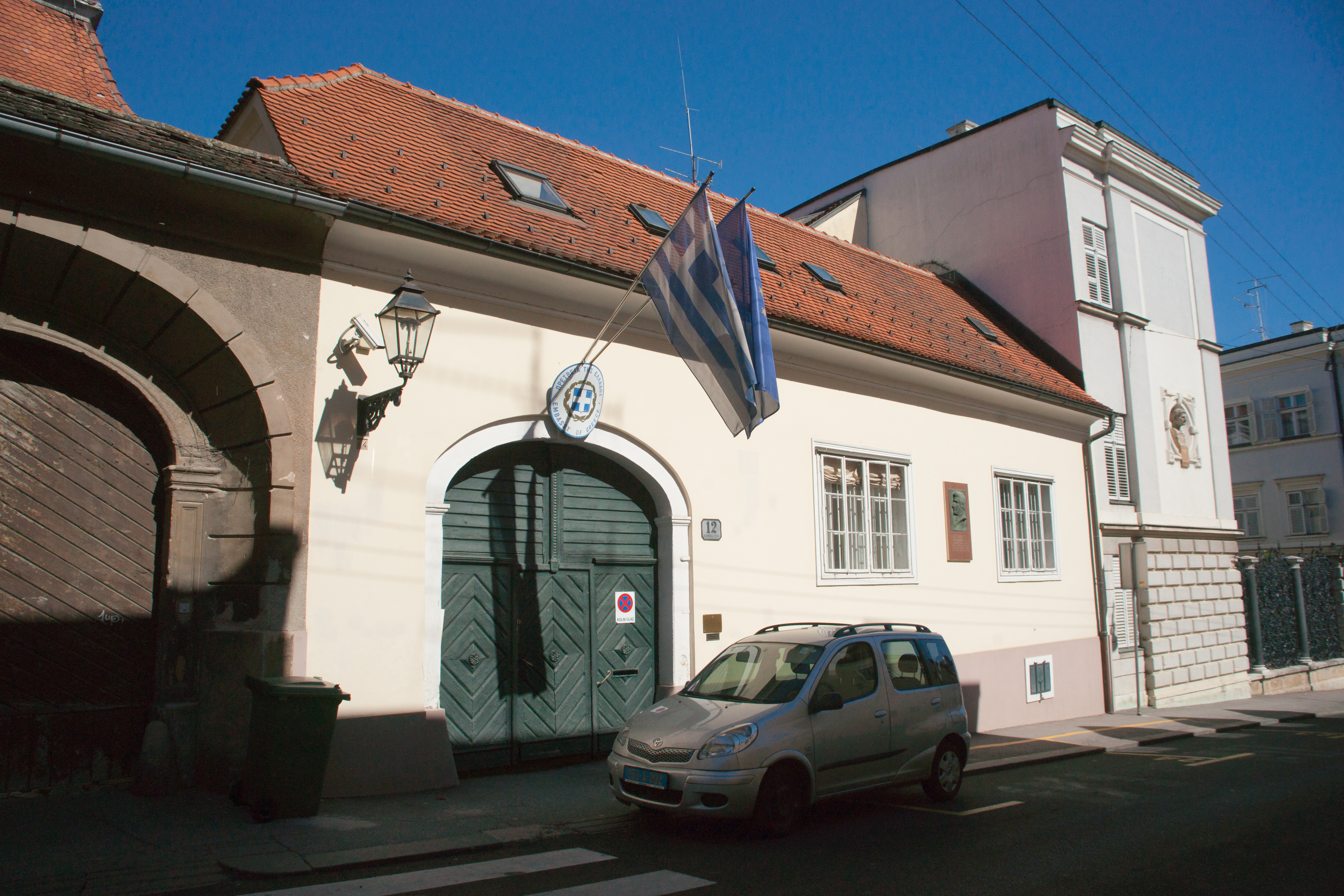
Embassy of Greece

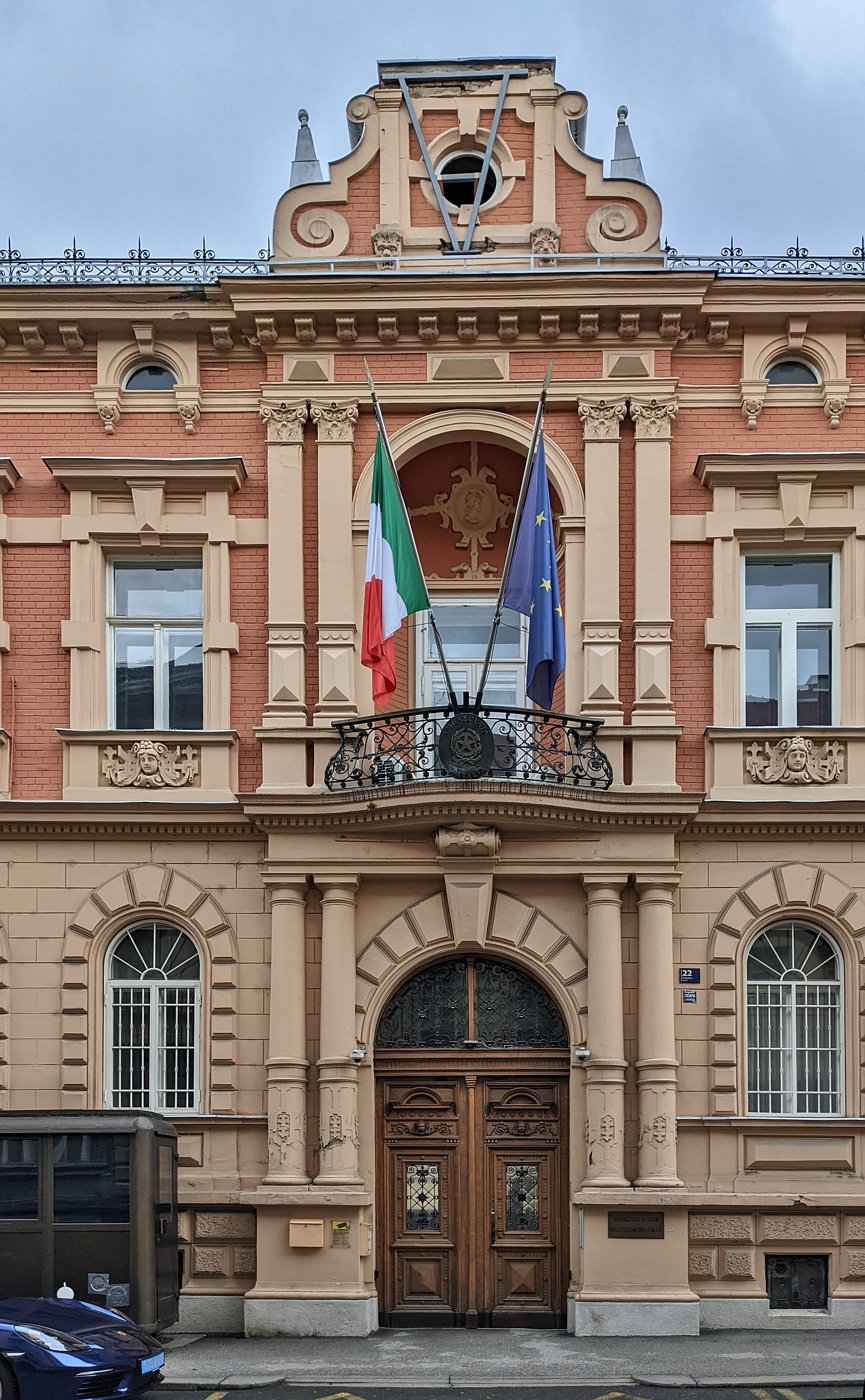
Embassy of Italy

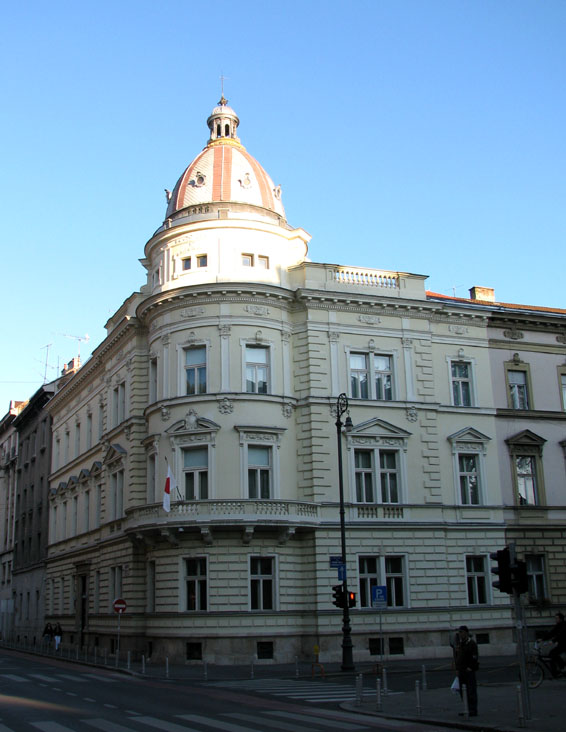
Embassy of Japan

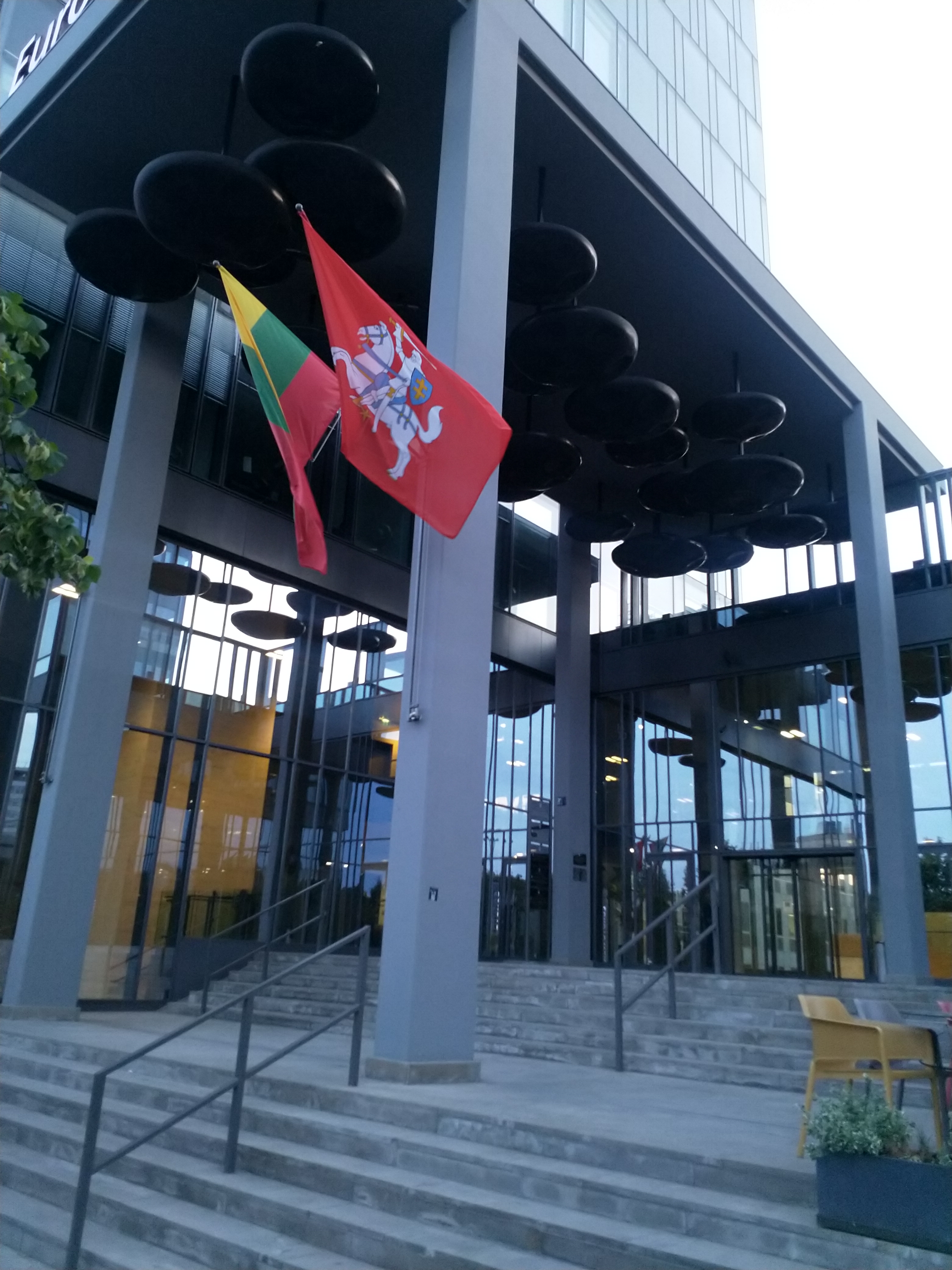
Embassy of Lithuania

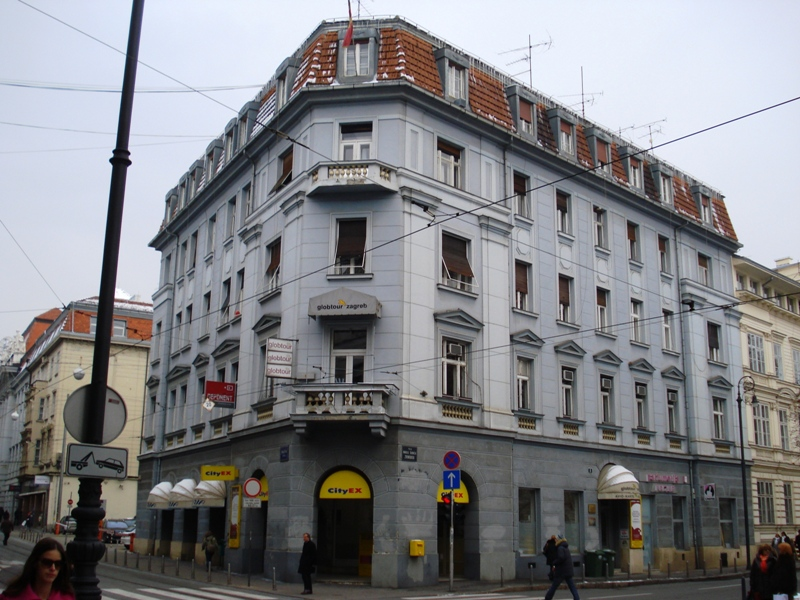
Embassy of Montenegro

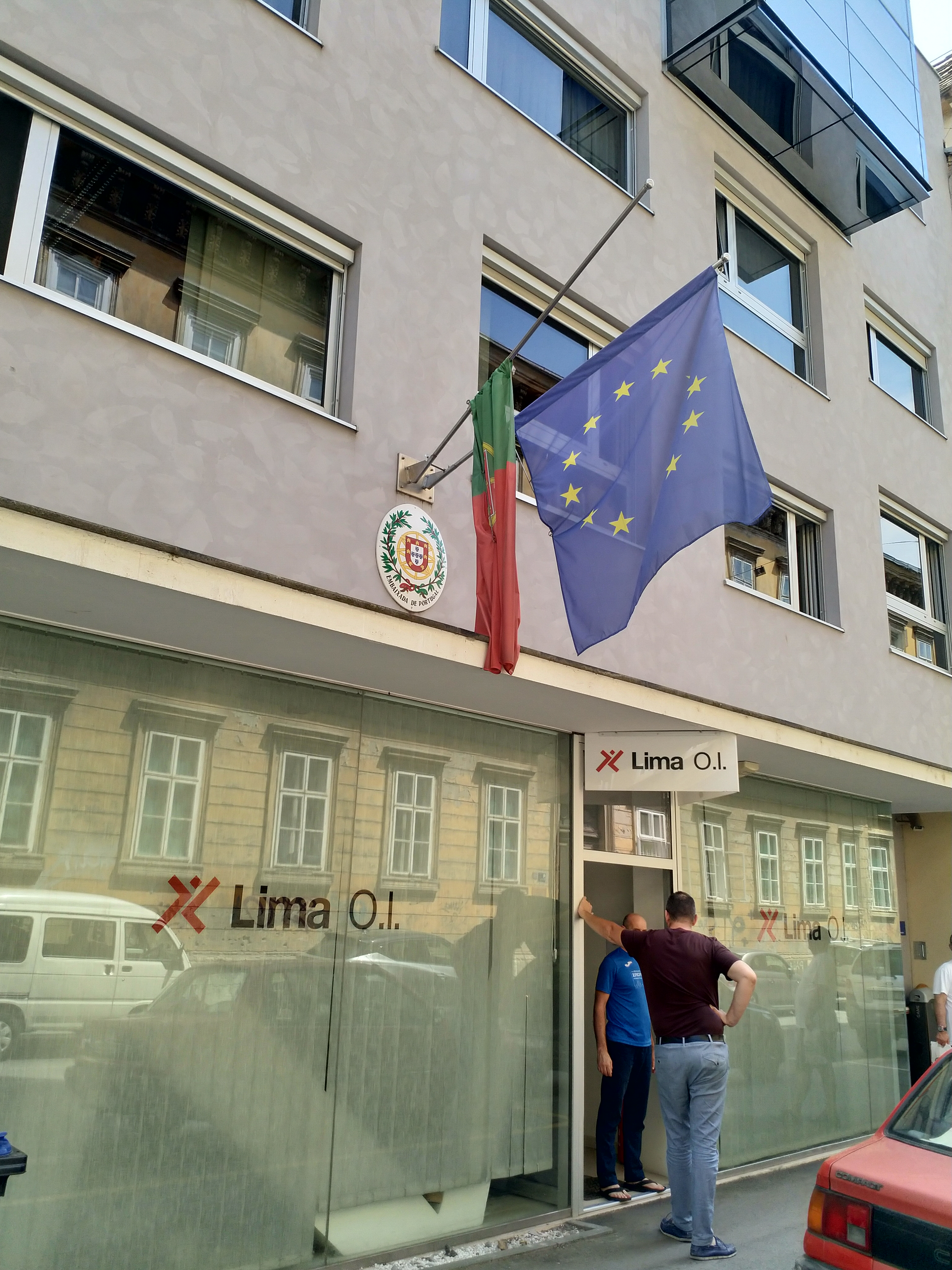
Embassy of Portugal

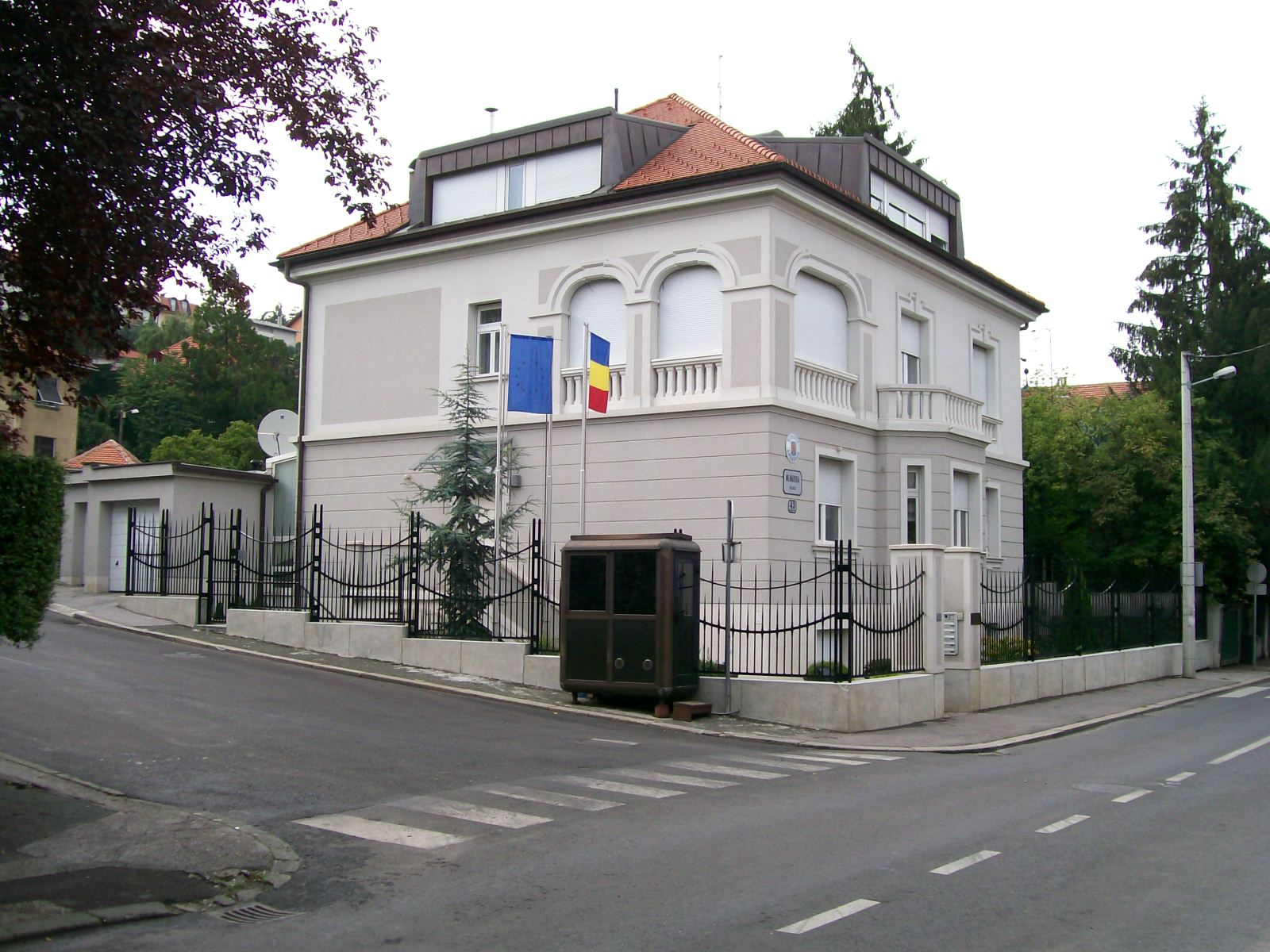
Embassy of Romania

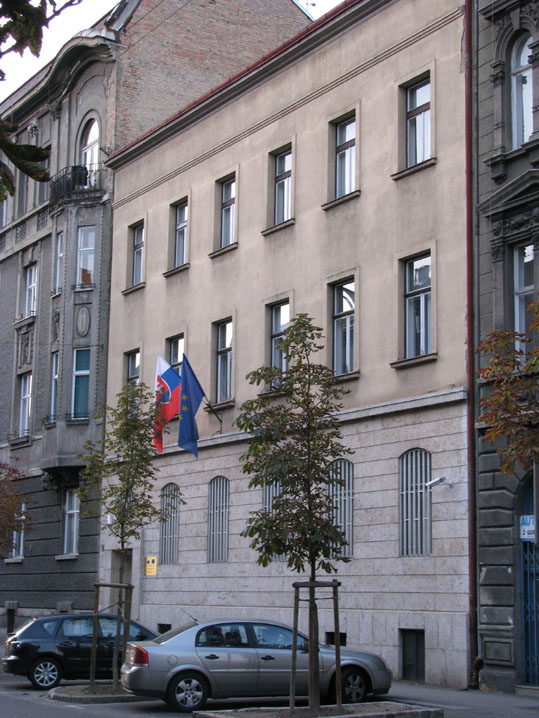
Embassy of Slovakia

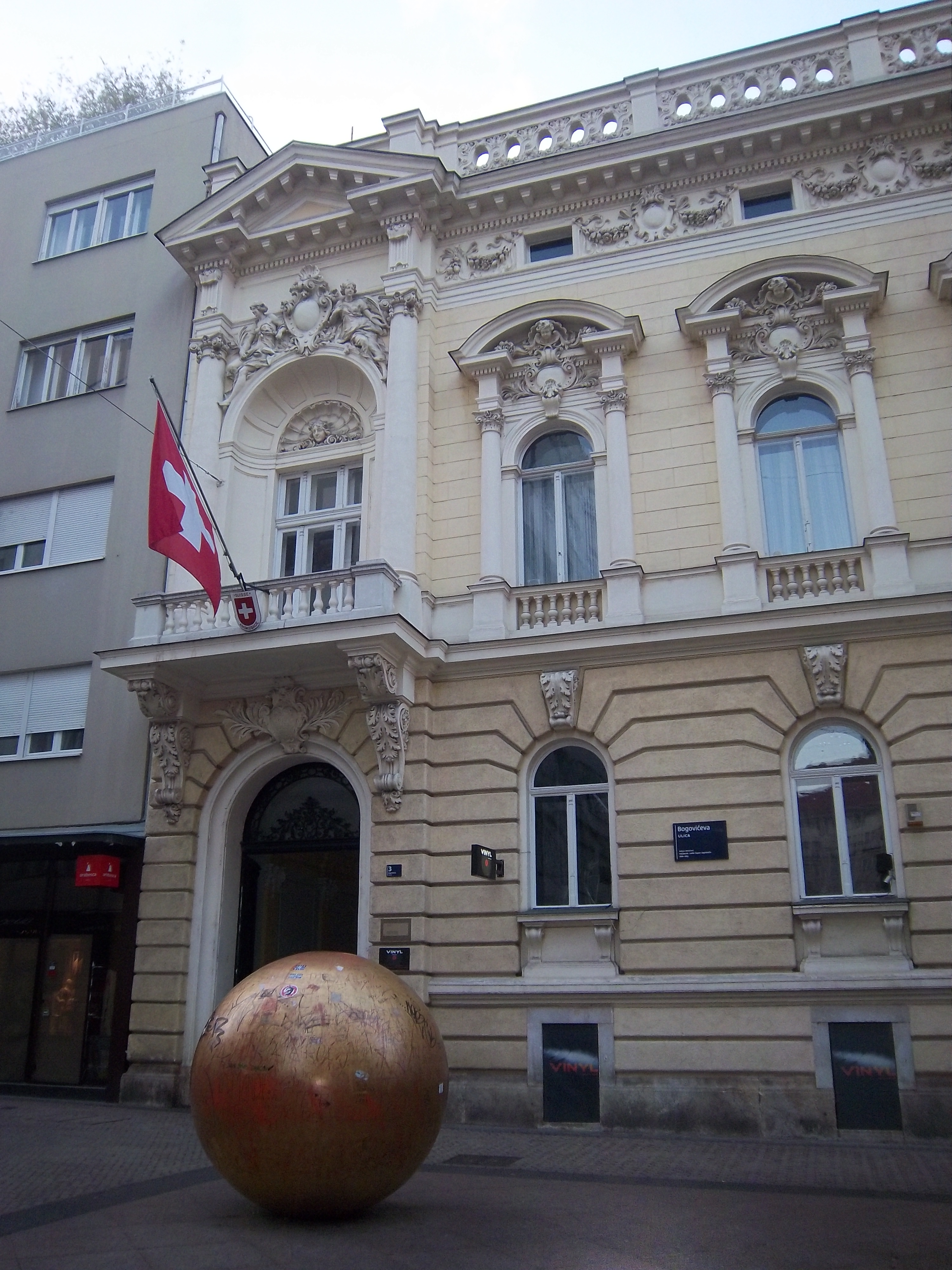
Embassy of Switzerland

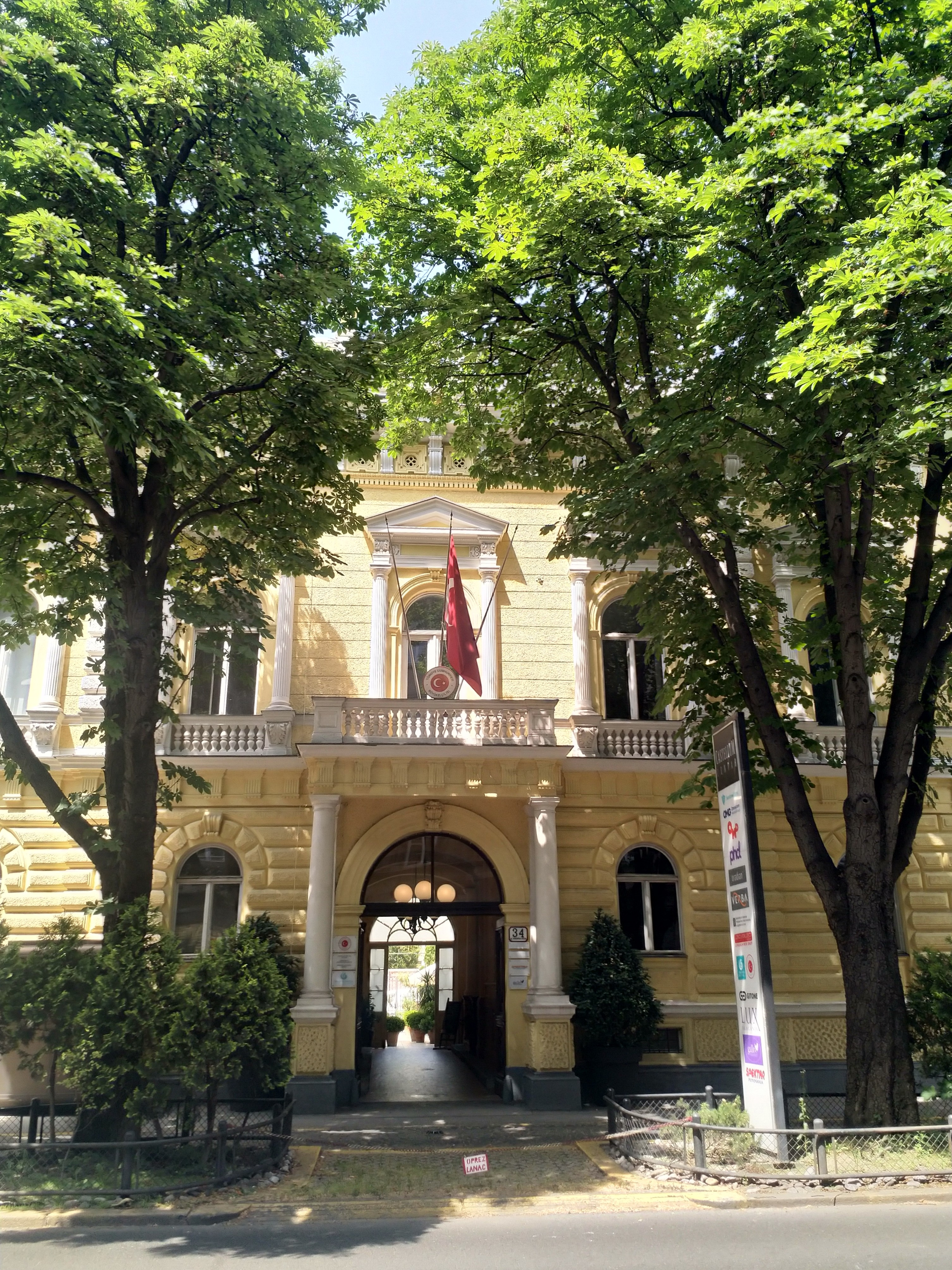
Embassy of Turkey

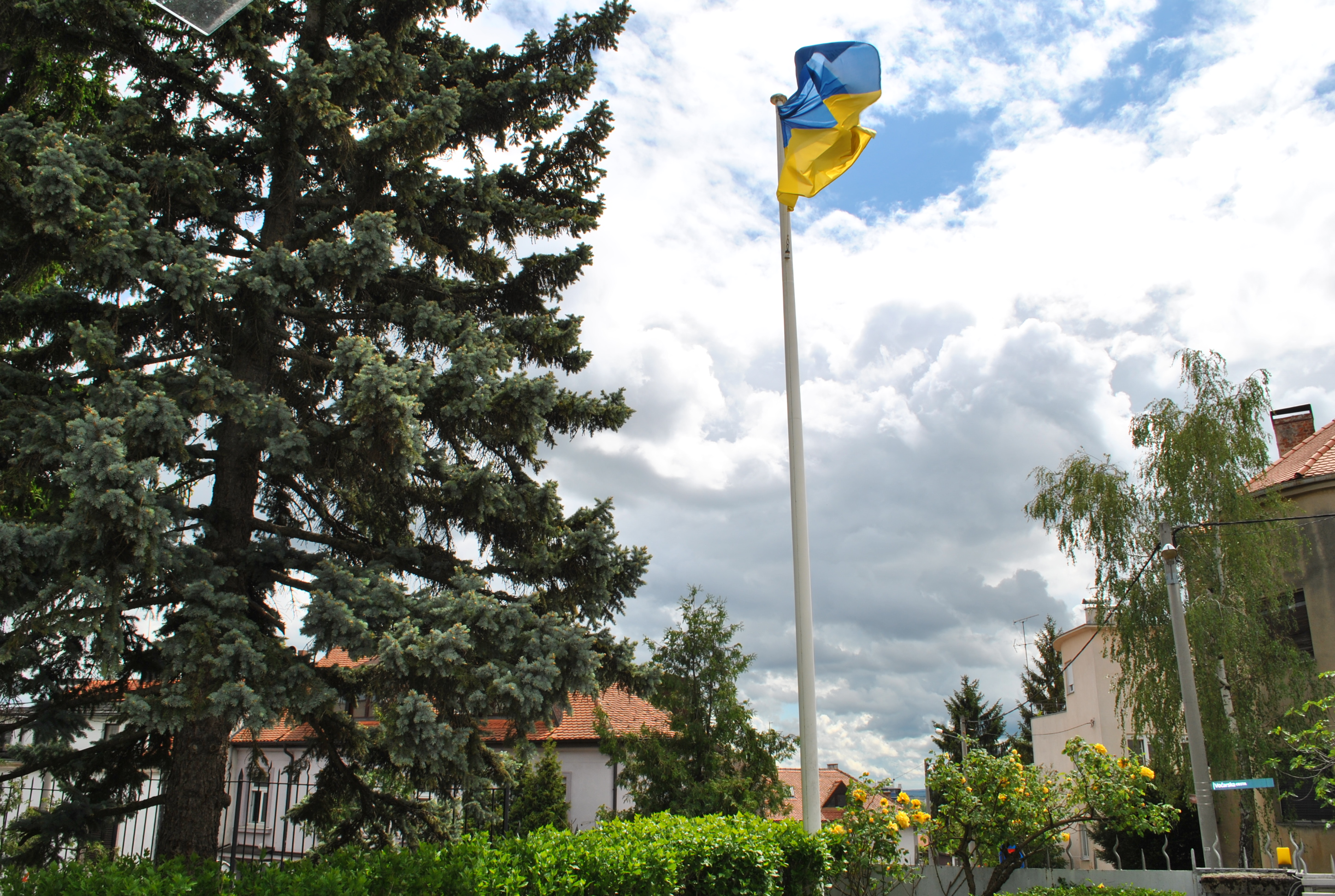
Embassy of Ukraine

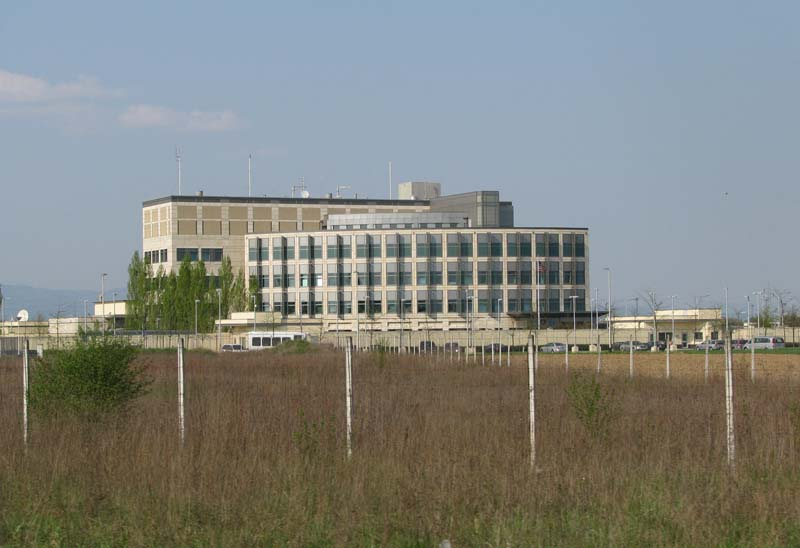
Embassy of the United States

== Consular missions ==
=== Rijeka ===
1. Bosnia and Herzegovina (Consulate-General)
2. Italy (Consulate-General)
3. Serbia (Consulate-General)

=== Osijek ===
1. Hungary (Consulate-General)

=== Split ===
1. United Kingdom (Consulate)

=== Vukovar ===
1. Serbia (Consulate-General)

== Non-resident embassies accredited to Croatia ==
=== Resident in Berlin, Germany ===
1. Cambodia
2. Jamaica
3. Malawi
4. Somalia
5. Sri Lanka
6. United Arab Emirates

=== Resident in Brussels, Belgium ===
1. Myanmar
2. Gambia
3. Seychelles

=== Resident in Budapest, Hungary ===
1. Argentina
2. Belarus
3. Ecuador
4. Latvia
5. Mexico
6. Moldova
7. Nigeria
8. Peru
9. South Africa
10. Sudan
11. Thailand
12. Vietnam

=== Resident in Prague, Czechia ===
1. Armenia
2. Colombia
3. Estonia
4. Kuwait

=== Resident in Rome, Italy ===
1. Bahrain
2. Burundi
3. Dominican Republic
4. Ethiopia
5. Ghana
6. Jordan
7. Lesotho
8. Liberia
9. Luxembourg
10. Mali
11. Mauritania
12. Monaco
13. New Zealand
14. Tanzania
15. Uganda
16. Uruguay
17. Zambia

=== Resident in Vienna, Austria ===
1. Angola
2. Bolivia
3. Burkina Faso
4. Costa Rica
5. Cuba
6. Cyprus
7. El Salvador
8. Iceland
9. Ivory Coast
10. Kenya
11. Laos
12. Lebanon
13. Mongolia
14. Namibia
15. Nepal
16. Panama
17. Palestine
18. Paraguay
19. Philippines
20. Tunisia
21. Venezuela
22. Yemen

=== Resident elsewhere ===
1. Andorra (Andorra la Vella)
2. Bangladesh (The Hague)
3. Botswana (London)
4. Eswatini (New York City)
5. Guyana (London)
6. Malta (Valletta)
7. North Korea (Bucharest)
8. Pakistan (Sarajevo)
9. San Marino (San Marino)
10. Saudi Arabia (Sarajevo)
11. Turkmenistan (Bucharest)

== No relations ==
- Bhutan
- Niger
- Tonga
