= Embassy of Ukraine, Zagreb =

Embassy of Ukraine in Croatia

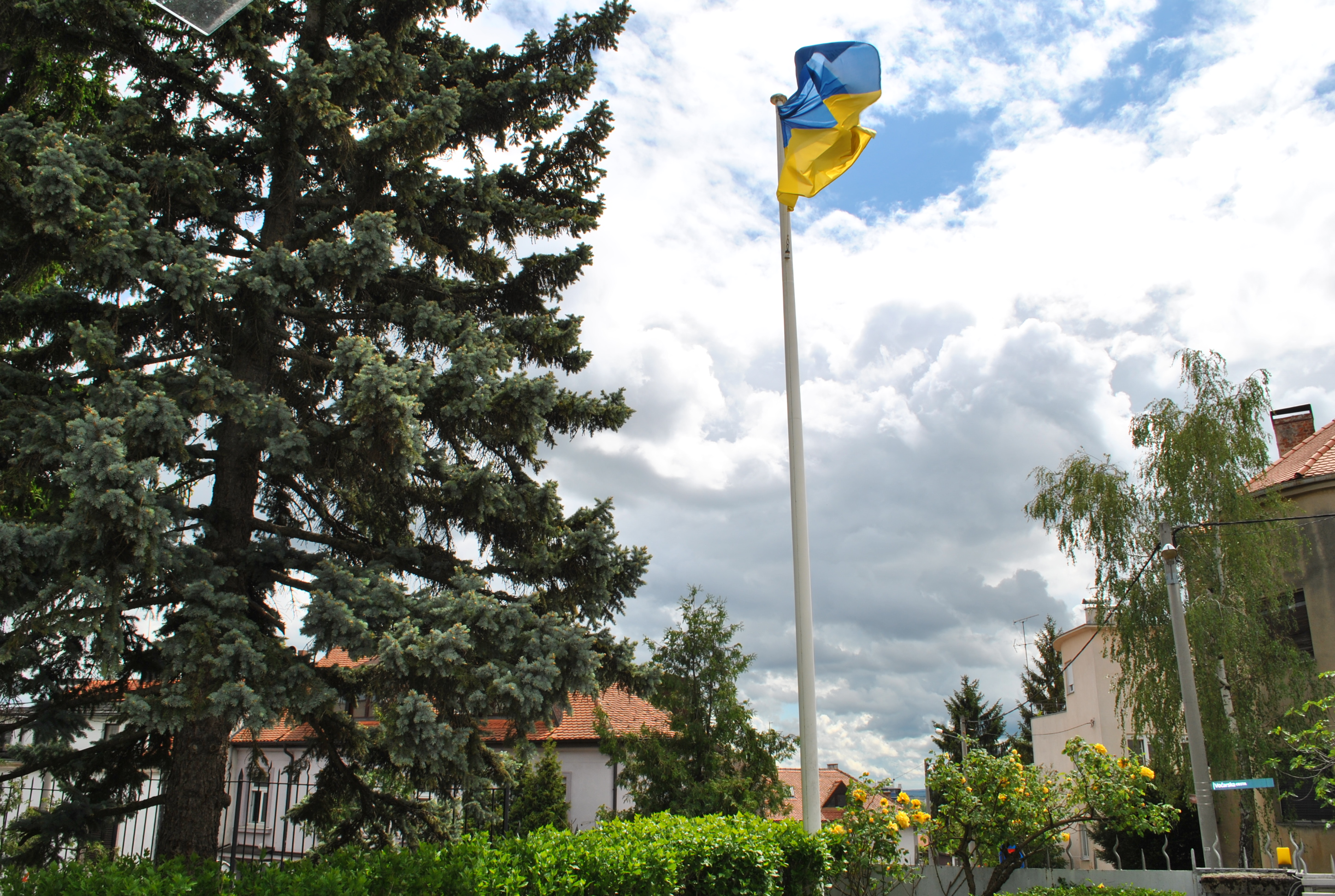
- Location: Zagreb
- Address: Voćarska cesta 52, Zagreb
- Coordinates: 45°49′02″N 15°59′25″E
- Ambassador: Vasyl Kyrylych
- Website: https://croatia.mfa.gov.ua/hr

The Ukrainian Embassy in Zagreb is the diplomatic mission of Ukraine in Croatia. The embassy building is located at Voćarska cesta 52 in Zagreb . The Ukrainian ambassador to Croatia has been Vasyl Kyrylych since December 2019.

== History ==
After the collapse of the Soviet Union, Ukraine declared itself independent in August 1991. Croatia recognized it as an independent state on December 5, 1991. The establishment of diplomatic relations with Croatia was agreed in January 1994. The embassy in Zagreb was opened in 1995. Anatoly Shostak was accredited as the first ambassador .

In 2019, cooperation between the diplomatic universities of both countries was agreed upon.

== Ambassadors and envoys of Ukraine in Croatia ==
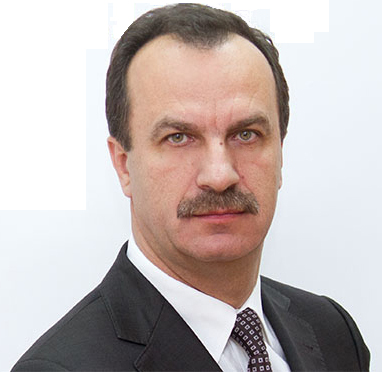
Vasyl Kyrylych, Ambassador since 2019

- Anatoly Shostak (1995-2001)
- Andriy Olefirov (2001)
- Viktor Kyryk (2001-2006)
- Markian Lubkivskyi (2006-2009)
- Borys Saychuk (2009-2010)
- Anatoly Chernyshenko (2010)
- Oleksandr Levchenko (2010-2017)
- Yaroslav Simonov (2018)
- Serhiy Horopacha (2019)
- Vasyl Kyrylych (2019–)

== See also ==
- Croatia-Ukraine relations
- List of diplomatic missions in Croatia
- Foreign relations of Croatia
- Foreign relations of Ukraine
