= Pride parade =

LGBTQ celebration event

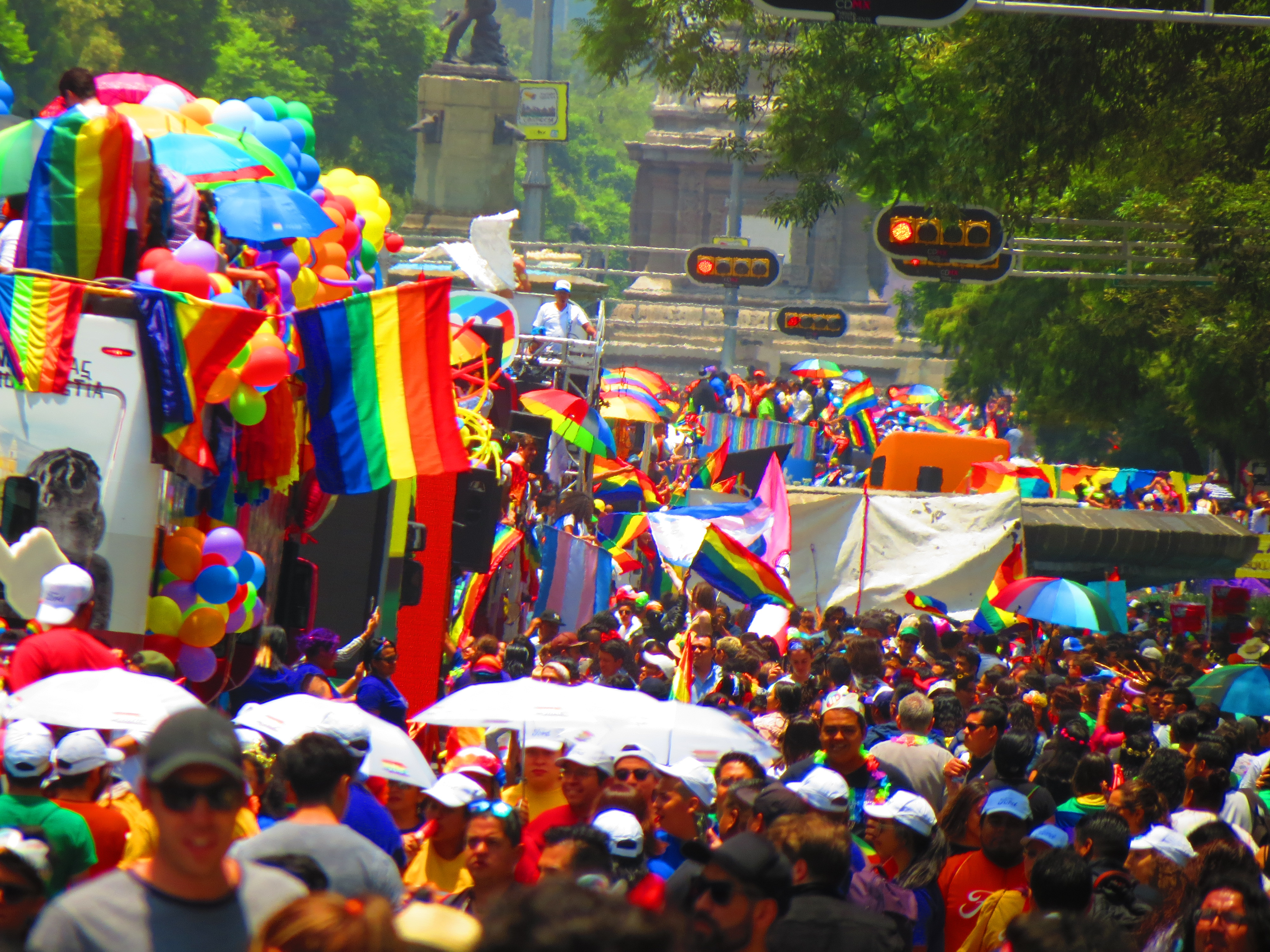
- Pride March on Paseo de la Reforma, Mexico City, 2019
- Status: Active
- Genre: Festival and parade
- Frequency: Annually, often late June
- Locations: Worldwide, including cities and towns in Argentina, Australia, Brazil, Canada, Chile, Colombia, France, Germany, Greece, Italy, Japan, Mexico, Poland, South Africa, Spain, Sweden, Thailand, the United Kingdom and the United States.
- Years active: 56
- Inaugurated: June 27, 1970 in Chicago and San Francisco. June 28, 1970 in New York City and Los Angeles.

A pride parade (also known as a pride event, pride festival, pride march, pride protest, equality parade, or equality march) is an event where lesbian, gay, bisexual, transgender and queer (LGBTQ) people and their allies celebrate LGBTQ social and self-acceptance, achievements, legal rights, and pride. The events sometimes also serve as demonstrations for legal rights such as same-sex marriage. Most occur annually throughout the Western world, while some take place every June to commemorate the 1969 Stonewall riots in New York City, which was a pivotal moment in modern LGBTQ social movements. The parades seek to create community and honor the history of the movement.

In 1970, pride and protest marches were held in Chicago, New York City, Los Angeles, and San Francisco around the first anniversary of Stonewall. The events became annual and also grew internationally. In 2019, New York and the world celebrated the largest international Pride celebration in history: Stonewall 50 - WorldPride NYC 2019, commemorating the 50th anniversary of the Stonewall Riots, with five million attending in Manhattan alone.

== Background ==
In the 1960s and 1970s a surge of public demonstrations in the US focused on civil rights, anti-war movements, and early LGBTQ+ rights activism. One of the first demonstrations for the cause of gay and lesbian rights was a 1965 "homophile march" by the Mattachine Society and Daughters of Bilitis outside the White House, highlighting discrimination in federal employment and advancing LGBTQ+ equality.

Also in 1965, the gay rights protest movement was visible at the Annual Reminder pickets, again organized by members of the lesbian group Daughters of Bilitis, and the gay men's group Mattachine Society. Mattachine members were also involved in demonstrations in support of homosexuals imprisoned in Cuban labor camps. Early on the morning of Saturday, June 28, 1969, LGBTQ people rioted following a police raid on the Stonewall Inn in the Greenwich Village neighborhood of Lower Manhattan, New York City. The Stonewall Inn was a gay bar which catered to an assortment of patrons, but which was popular with the most marginalized people in the gay community: transvestites, transgender people, effeminate young men, hustlers, and homeless youth.

== First pride marches ==
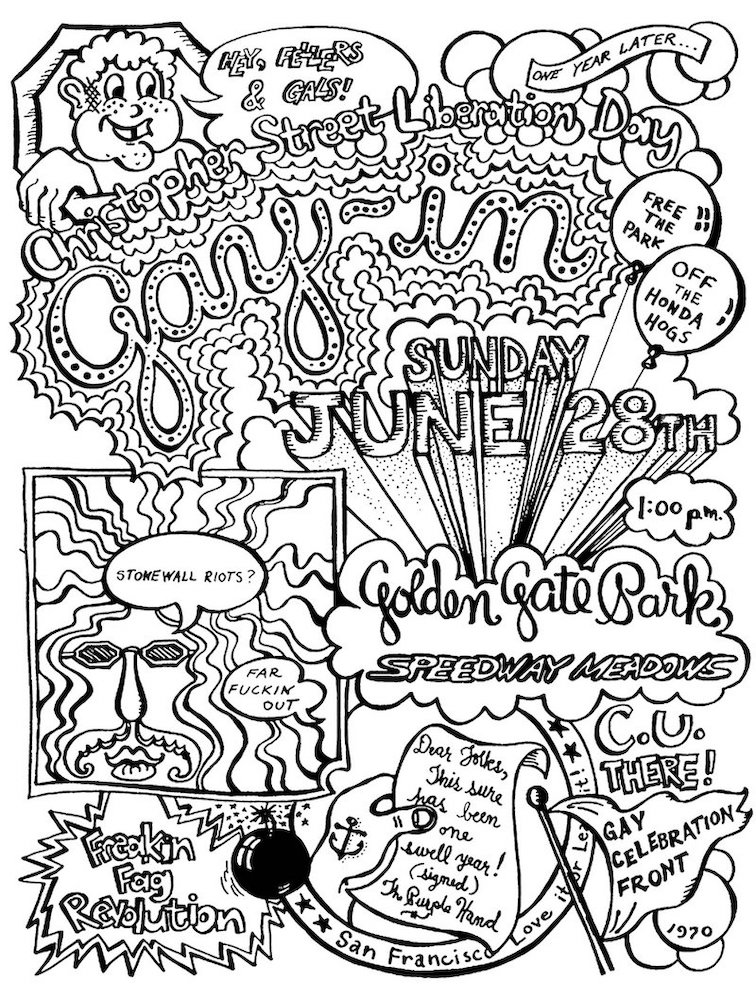
Christopher Street Liberation Day Gay-In offset flyer, San Francisco, California, 1970

As the movement became more radical in the late 1960s, particularly after the Stonewall Uprising, they were called Gay Liberation or Gay Freedom marches which emphasized demands for full equality and liberation.

On Saturday, June 27, 1970, the Chicago Gay Liberation organized a march from Washington Square Park ("Bughouse Square") to the Water Tower at the intersection of Michigan and Chicago avenues, which was the route originally planned, and then many of the participants spontaneously marched on to the Civic Center (now Richard J. Daley) Plaza. The date was chosen because the Stonewall events began on the last Saturday of June and because organizers wanted to reach the maximum number of Michigan Avenue shoppers.

The West Coast of the United States saw a march in San Francisco on June 27, 1970, and 'Gay-in' on June 28, 1970 and a march in Los Angeles on June 28, 1970. In Los Angeles, Morris Kight (Gay Liberation Front LA founder), Reverend Troy Perry (Universal Fellowship of Metropolitan Community Churches founder) and Reverend Bob Humphries (United States Mission founder) gathered to plan a commemoration. They settled on a parade down Hollywood Boulevard. But securing a permit from the city was no easy task. They named their organization Christopher Street West, "as ambiguous as we could be." But Rev. Perry recalled the Los Angeles Police Chief Edward M. Davis telling him, "As far as I'm concerned, granting a permit to a group of homosexuals to parade down Hollywood Boulevard would be the same as giving a permit to a group of thieves and robbers." Grudgingly, the Police Commission granted the permit, though there were fees exceeding $1.5 million. After the American Civil Liberties Union stepped in, the commission dropped all its requirements but a $1,500 fee for police service. That, too, was dismissed when the California Superior Court ordered the police to provide protection as they would for any other group. The eleventh-hour California Supreme Court decision ordered the police commissioner to issue a parade permit citing the "constitutional guarantee of freedom of expression." From the beginning, L.A. parade organizers and participants knew there were risks of violence. Kight received death threats right up to the morning of the parade. Unlike later editions, the first gay parade was very quiet. The marchers convened on Mccadden Place in Hollywood, marched north and turned east onto Hollywood Boulevard. The Advocate reported "Over 1,000 homosexuals and their friends staged, not just a protest march, but a full-blown parade down world-famous Hollywood Boulevard."

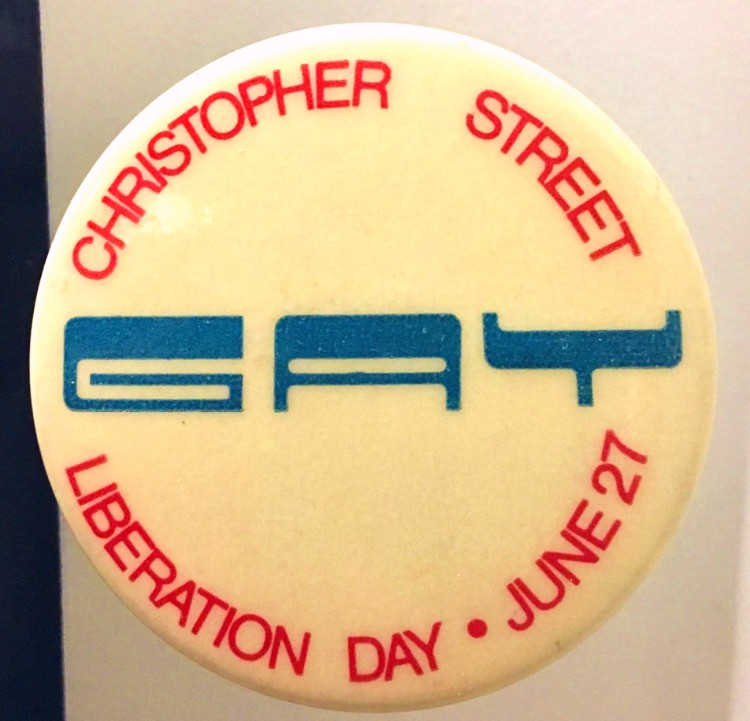
Christopher Street Liberation Day button promoting the second annual NYC Pride March on June 27, 1971

On Sunday, June 28, 1970, at around noon, in New York gay activist groups held their own pride parade, known as the Christopher Street Liberation Day, to recall the events of Stonewall one year earlier. On November 2, 1969, Craig Rodwell, his partner Fred Sargeant, Ellen Broidy, and Linda Rhodes proposed the first gay pride parade to be held in New York City by way of a resolution at the Eastern Regional Conference of Homophile Organizations (ERCHO) meeting in Philadelphia.

That the Annual Reminder, in order to be more relevant, reach a greater number of people, and encompass the ideas and ideals of the larger struggle in which we are engaged-that of our fundamental human rights-be moved both in time and location.

We propose that a demonstration be held annually on the last Saturday in June in New York City to commemorate the 1969 spontaneous demonstrations on Christopher Street and this demonstration be called "Christopher Street Liberation Day". No dress or age regulations shall be made for this demonstration.

We also propose that we contact homophile organizations throughout the country and suggest that they hold parallel demonstrations on that day. We propose a nationwide show of support.

All attendees to the ERCHO meeting in Philadelphia voted for the march except for the Mattachine Society of New York City, which abstained. Members of the Gay Liberation Front (GLF) attended the meeting and were seated as guests of Rodwell's group, Homophile Youth Movement in Neighborhoods (HYMN).

Meetings to organize the march began in early January at Rodwell's apartment in 350 Bleecker Street. At first there was difficulty getting some of the major New York organizations like Gay Activists Alliance (GAA) to send representatives. Craig Rodwell and his partner Fred Sargeant, Ellen Broidy, Michael Brown, Marty Nixon, and Foster Gunnison of Mattachine made up the core group of the CSLD Umbrella Committee (CSLDUC). For initial funding, Gunnison served as treasurer and sought donations from the national homophile organizations and sponsors, while Sargeant solicited donations via the Oscar Wilde Memorial Bookshop customer mailing list and Nixon worked to gain financial support from GLF in his position as treasurer for that organization. Other mainstays of the GLF organizing committee were Judy Miller, Jack Waluska, Steve Gerrie and Brenda Howard. Believing that more people would turn out for the march on a Sunday, and so as to mark the date of the start of the Stonewall uprising, the CSLDUC scheduled the date for the first march for Sunday, June 28, 1970. With Dick Leitsch's replacement as president of Mattachine NY by Michael Kotis in April 1970, opposition to the march by Mattachine ended.

The first marches were both serious and fun and served to inspire the widening LGBTQ movement; they were repeated in the following years and more and more annual marches started up in other cities throughout the world. In Atlanta and New York City the marches were called Gay Liberation Marches, and the day of celebration was called "Gay Liberation Day"; in Los Angeles and San Francisco they became known as 'Gay Freedom Marches' and the day was called "Gay Freedom Day". As more cities and even smaller towns began holding their own celebrations, these names spread. The rooted ideology behind the parades is a critique of space which has been produced to seem heteronormative and 'straight', and therefore any act appearing to be homosexual is considered dissident by society. The Parade brings this queer culture into the space. The marches spread internationally, including to London where the first "gay pride rally" took place on 1 July 1972, the date chosen deliberately to mark the third anniversary of the Stonewall riots.

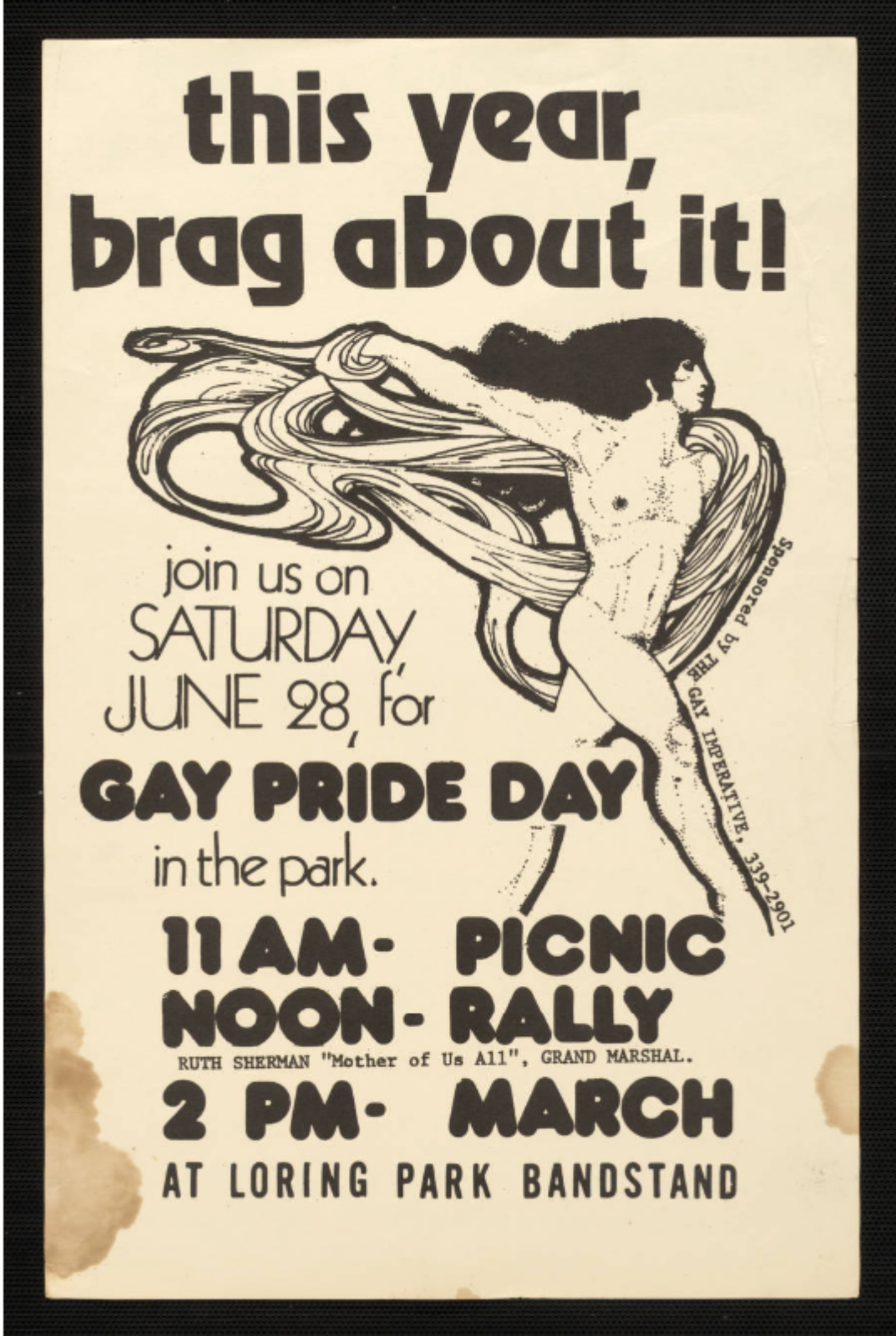
Gay Pride Day Poster, Minneapolis, Minnesota, 1975

In the 1980s, there was a cultural shift in the gay movement. Activists of a less radical nature began taking over the march committees in different cities, and they dropped "Gay Liberation" and "Gay Freedom" from the names, replacing them with "Gay Pride". The term "Gay Pride" was claimed to be coined either by Jack Baker and Michael McConnell, an activist couple in Minnesota, or by Thom Higgins, another gay rights activist in Minnesota.

West Asia had its first pride march in 1993 in Israel. The pride march has grown to over 250,000 participants by 2019. In 2017, the first pride march week in the Middle East was established in Lebanon.

The oldest LGBT community center in South Florida Pridelines has been a partner of Miami Beach Pride for more than a decade.

In Southeast Asia, the first pride march was celebrated on June 26, 1994, when 30-50 individuals marched in Quezon City in the Philippines. Less than three decades later, the government rejected an equality legislation, sparking the largest pride march in Southeast Asia, where over 110,000 people in 2023 marched in Quezon City in support of the SOGIE Equality Bill.

East Asia saw its first pride march on August 28, 1994, when a march was held in Tokyo in Japan. The largest ever pride march in the region was held in 2022 when over 120,000 people marched in Taiwan to support equal rights.

The first pride march in South Asia was held on July 2, 1999, in the city of Kolkata in India.

== Timeline of first pride marches ==
This table provides a chronological timeline of the established public Pride marches and parades globally. While many countries had earlier private gatherings, indoor festivals, or small-scale protests, this list prioritizes the first instances of organized, high-visibility street demonstrations specifically identifying as Pride.

Established	Country	Per year	Total
1970	United States	1	1
1972	United Kingdom	1	2
1973	Canada (Note: While isolated protests occurred in 1971, it was in 1973 that Canada held its first nationwide "Pride Week." This historic event featured coordinated rallies and marches across cities such as Toronto, Vancouver, and Montreal, laying the foundation for the "Pride" movement in Canada.)	1	3
1977	Spain (Note: Following the end of the dictatorship, thousands of people gathered in Barcelona in 1977 for Spain's first large-scale LGBT demonstration. Despite being met with police repression, the march became a turning point that led to the decriminalization of homosexuality in 1979 and the establishment of annual marches in Madrid, Barcelona and other cities by 1978.); Sweden (Note: In 1971, a small protest took place in Uppsala, but it was an isolated event, with no follow-up marches in Uppsala or Örebro for several years. The tradition of LGBTQ+ pride in Sweden officially began in 1977, with the first "Gay Liberation Day" in Stockholm.)	2	5
1978	Australia; Switzerland	2	7
1979	Belgium; Denmark; Germany (Note: In 1972, a small protest took place in Münster, but it was an isolated event, with no follow-up marches in the city for several years. The tradition of "Christopher Street Day" (CSD) officially began in 1979, when marches were held in Berlin, Bremen, and Cologne.); Mexico; Netherlands (Note: After the 1977 protest against American activist Anita Bryant, the community began to shift its focus toward domestic issues. This transition culminated in 1979 with the official launch of "Pink Saturday" (Roze Zaterdag), marking the beginning of the event as a permanent, traveling annual tradition.)	5	12
1981	Finland (Note: The first "Freedom Days" (Vapautuspäivät) occurred in 1974, but the event was largely confined to an indoor gathering with a low-key demonstration outside the Parliament. It had no music, no parade, and very little public exposure. The large, public march through Helsinki did not emerge until 1981.); France	2	14
1982	Norway	1	15
1983	Colombia; Ireland	2	17
1990	South Africa	1	18
1991	New Zealand	1	19
1992	Argentina	1	20
1993	Israel (Note: During the 1970s and 80s, Pride events in Tel Aviv were small gatherings held in parks, rather than large street parades. It wasn’t until 1993 that the first official public demonstration for LGBTQ rights took place, which eventually evolved into the annual Tel Aviv Pride Parade. In contrast, the Jerusalem Pride march, which started in 2002, has been overshadowed by tragedy: in 2005 and 2015, an extremist attacked participants, and the latter incident tragically led to the death of a 16-year-old girl.); Uruguay	2	22
1994	Italy (Note: A small group of activists gathered in 1972 in Sanremo to oppose the pathologization of homosexuality by the psychiatric community. In 1979, another protest occurred in Pisa following the brutal murder of a young gay man. While both were significant, they were isolated events responding to particular injustices. The tradition of National Pride began with the 1994 march in Rome.); Japan; Philippines	3	25
1996	Austria	1	26
1997	Brazil; El Salvador; Hungary	3	29
1998	Ecuador	1	30
1999	Chile; India; Luxembourg; Thailand	4	34
2000	Bolivia; Guatemala; Honduras; Iceland (Note: In 1993 and 1994, the "Freedom Marches" were held with a small group of activists demanding human rights, followed by a community festival in 1999. The first official Reykjavík Pride Parade (Gleðigangan, or "The Joy Parade") was held in 2000.); Portugal (Note: During the 1990s, the LGBTQ community organized Pride events, but these were primarily indoor gatherings, festivals and parties. The first real street march for LGBTQ rights, which evolved into the annual Lisbon Pride (Marcha do Orgulho LGBT), took place only in 2000.); South Korea	6	40
2001	Dominican Republic; Poland; Slovenia; Venezuela	4	44
2002	Croatia (Note: The first march in Zagreb was met with severe violence, including physical assaults and the use of tear gas by counter-protesters. It required a heavy police presence for protection, a practice that has continued in subsequent years.); Peru	2	46
2003	Andorra; Cambodia; Taiwan; Turkey (Note: The first "Istanbul Pride" (İstanbul Onur Yürüyüşü) was held in 2003. For more than a decade, the march along with similar parades in Ankara, Izmir, Antalya, Mersin and others proceeded without major incidents or violence. This stood in sharp contrast to the violent disruptions and bloody confrontations in countries like Bulgaria, Croatia, Serbia, Slovakia, Ukraine, and Russia. Since 2015, the Turkish government has banned the parades, using tear gas and water cannons to disperse the crowds. Activists continue to organize Pride events in defiance of the bans.)	4	50
2004	Estonia; Latvia; Malta; Panama; Paraguay	5	55
2005	Greece (Note: Although various "pride" events and small activist protests took place in Athens as early as the mid-1980s, these were often low-profile and isolated. It wasn't until 2005 that the historic first Athens Pride parade marched through the city center, passing by the Hellenic Parliament.); Romania	2	57
2006	Mauritius	1	58
2008	Bulgaria (Note: The first Sofia Pride was violently attacked by more than 100 skinheads and ultra-nationalists, with 88 of the attackers being arrested. Since then, the event has grown, though it continues to be heavily guarded by the police.); Cuba (Note: The first government-sanctioned Pride events began in 2008 as the Conga against Homophobia and Transphobia. Organized by the state-run National Center for Sex Education (CENESEX).); Costa Rica; Czech Republic (Note: The first-ever public Pride march in the Czech Republic, known as the "Queer Parade," took place in the city of Brno in 2008. This event was met with significant violence, as extremist groups attacked marchers with tear gas and stones, forcing organizers to shorten the route despite a heavy police presence.)	4	62
2009	Singapore (Note: Due to strict laws governing public demonstrations, Singapore's main event, Pink Dot SG, is officially classified as a "public gathering" held at Speakers' Corner, rather than a traditional street parade. Despite these legal restrictions, it has grown into a significant and widely recognized annual movement.)	1	63
2010	Lithuania (Note: For the first march, a massive police presence was required, and the event took place within a heavily fenced-off area to protect the 300 marchers from the thousands of protesters gathered outside the barriers.); Slovakia (Note: The first "Dúhový PRIDE" was held in Bratislava on May 22, 2010. The march was marred by violent assaults from far-right extremists, who threw stones and tear gas at participants, forcing the organizers to alter the route for safety. Despite initial violence, the event successfully established itself as an annual tradition. Following the 2022 terrorist attack at Tepláreň bar, the march has grown in size, becoming a solemn protest against hatred and a demand for legal recognition.)	2	65
2011	Suriname	1	66
2012	Albania; Vietnam	2	68
2013	Cape Verde; Lesotho; Moldova; Montenegro; Namibia; Ukraine (Note: The first successful march was held in 2013 under heavy police guard and lasted only 20 minutes to ensure participant safety. Subsequent years have seen continued threats from far-right groups, requiring "closed" routes and high-security cordons.)	6	74
2014	Cyprus (Note: While the first major Pride march in the Republic of Cyprus (South) took place in Nicosia on May 31, 2014, the first Pride event on the island actually occurred slightly earlier in Northern Cyprus. Activists there organized the first "Queer Cyprus" march on May 17, 2014.); Mongolia; Nicaragua; Serbia (Note: The first attempt in 2001 became known as the "bloody Pride," as participants were violently attacked by hooligans while police stood by. Following years of bans, the 2010 march was heavily guarded by 5,000 police officers, but it sparked riots from anti-LGBTQ groups, resulting in more than 100 injuries.)	4	78
2017	Barbados; Belize; Timor-Leste; Kosovo	4	82
2018	Eswatini; Fiji; Guyana; Trinidad and Tobago	4	86
2019	Bosnia and Herzegovina; Botswana; Myanmar (Note: Myanmar held its first public LGBT festival, &PROUD, in a public park in 2018. While limited in scale compared to traditional parades, the movement expanded in 2019 with a notable "Pride boat march" on the Yangon River.); Nepal; North Macedonia; Saint Lucia	6	92
2021	Malawi; Papua New Guinea	2	94
2022	Monaco	1	95
2023	Liechtenstein	1	96
2024	San Marino	1	97

=== Regional context and challenges ===
- Armenia Along with the Vatican City, Armenia remains one of the few European countries that has never held a public LGBTQ Pride demonstration. While the local community has organized indoor small festivals, these events are consistently targeted by violent extremists. To date, no public street parade has occurred due to extreme security threats and government refusal to provide necessary protection.
- Azerbaijan A small group of activists performed a brief, unsanctioned walk through Baku with a rainbow flag in 2013. Since then, activism has remained almost entirely digital or indoor to avoid state crackdowns.
- Belarus A 'Love Parade' was successfully held in Minsk in 1999. It has never been repeated as a public event. Between 2001 and 2012, activists made several attempts to organize marches, most notably the 2010 'Slavic Pride', but these were unauthorized and violently dispersed by riot police within minutes. Under the current administration, public Pride demonstrations are entirely prohibited.
- China While "Shanghai Pride" was a significant event for many years, it primarily consisted of private gatherings, such as parties and film festivals, rather than public demonstrations. Despite its prominence, a street parade through the city was never permitted by the government. After years of operation, Shanghai Pride officially ended its activities in 2020 due to increasing pressure from authorities.
- Georgia In 2013, a stationary rally was violently attacked by thousands of protesters led by priests. By 2019, activists pulled off a "guerrilla style" moving march lasting only 30 minutes to prevent disruption. In 2021 and 2023, larger marches were canceled after violent groups attacked Pride offices. The 2024 anti-LGBTQ law has further restricted the ability to organize public events.
- Indonesia There has never been a public Pride march due to increasing social and political pressure. During the 2010s, community-led festivals were held, but this period also marked the beginning of a harsh crackdown. As recently as 2025, authorities have conducted several large-scale arrests. This environment has been further restricted by the "no sex outside of marriage" law, which effectively criminalizes LGBTQ relationships as same-sex marriage is not recognized.
- Jamaica While private gatherings occurred for years, Jamaica held its first high-profile, week-long Pride celebration in 2015 in Kingston. Due to high rates of violence and "buggery" laws still on the books, events are mostly held in secure, private venues or community spaces.
- Kazakhstan There have never been official pride parades in Kazakhstan. LGBTQ visibility has largely been limited to small groups within broader Russian-speaking, feminist-led protests, as well as to individual acts of protest by lesbian feminist activists. Some of these actions, such as a photoshoot staged outside the Mausoleum of Khoja Ahmed Yasawi involving a rainbow flag were met with strong criticism from both the public and government authorities, who denounced them as disrespectful and provocative. Eventually, these actions fueled a conservative backlash, contributing to a rise in homophobia and the enactment of harsh anti-LGBTQ laws in late 2025.
- Kyrgyzstan On March 8, 2019, a notable demonstration took place in Bishkek on International Women's Day. While LGBTQ activists participated with rainbow flags, the event was primarily organized by feminist groups to protest violence against women. Since the demonstration was largely led by feminist activists and focused on broader gender rights, it is generally seen as a human rights march rather than a gay pride parade.
- Lebanon In 2017, the country launched 'Beirut Pride' as the first event of its kind in the Arab world. While several indoor cultural events were held, the planned street parade was canceled after organizers were briefly detained and threatened with 'incitement to debauchery' charges.
- Russia Early efforts to organize Pride events were met with extreme violence from state authorities and counter-protesters. Demonstrations were frequently targeted by extremist groups who assaulted participants with impunity. These attempts were unauthorized and violently suppressed within minutes, preventing them from evolving into established public marches. Such activities are now entirely curtailed by anti-LGBTQ laws and the 2023 legal designation of the movement as an 'extremist organization.'
- Uganda In 2012, activists managed to hold a small mobile march along a private beach road in Entebbe. However, the passage of the 2023 Anti-Homosexuality Act has made the environment much more dangerous. Pride events are regularly raided by authorities, and activists are forced to cancel public demonstrations entirely to avoid life imprisonment or the death penalty.

== Description ==
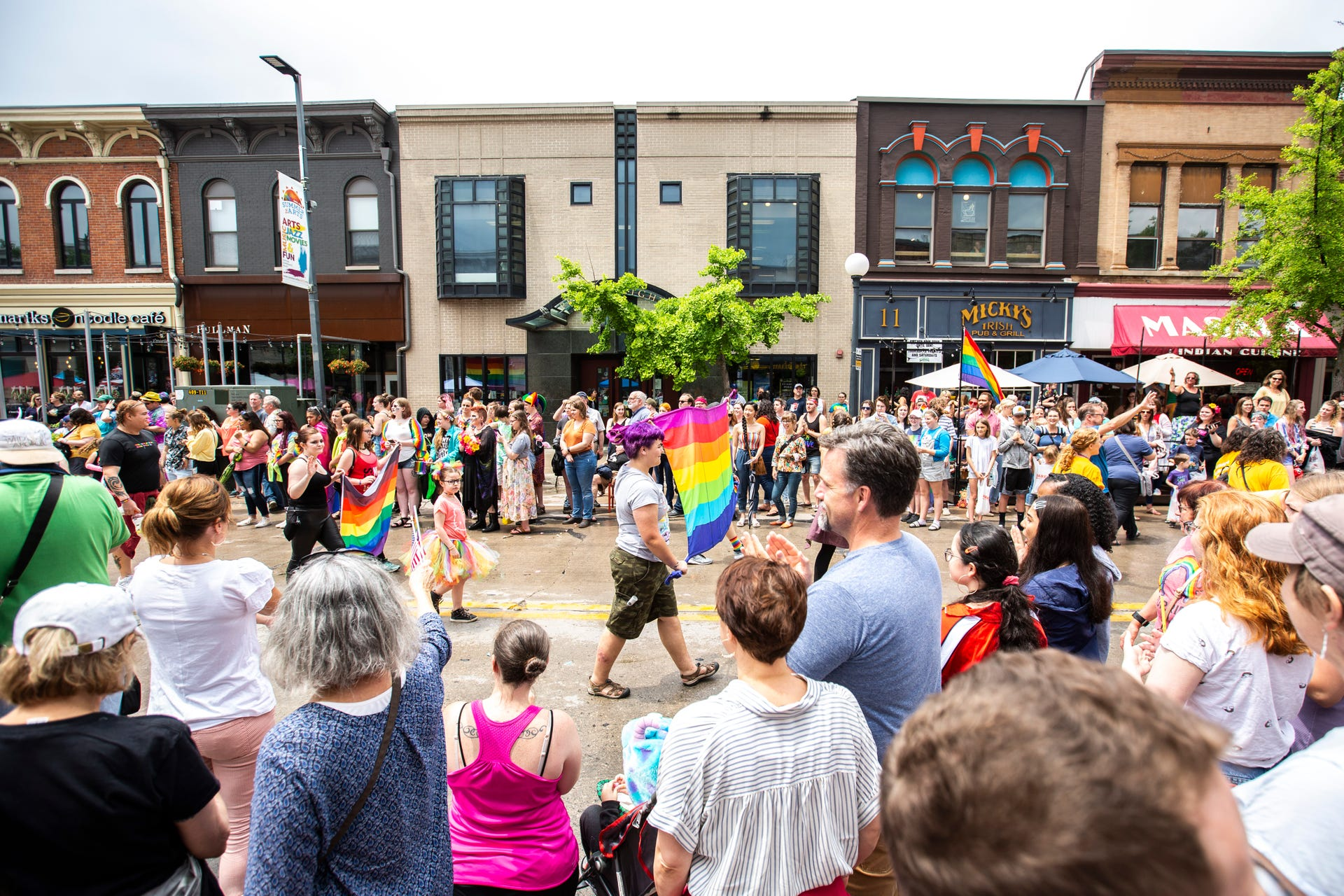
Pride parade in Iowa City, Iowa

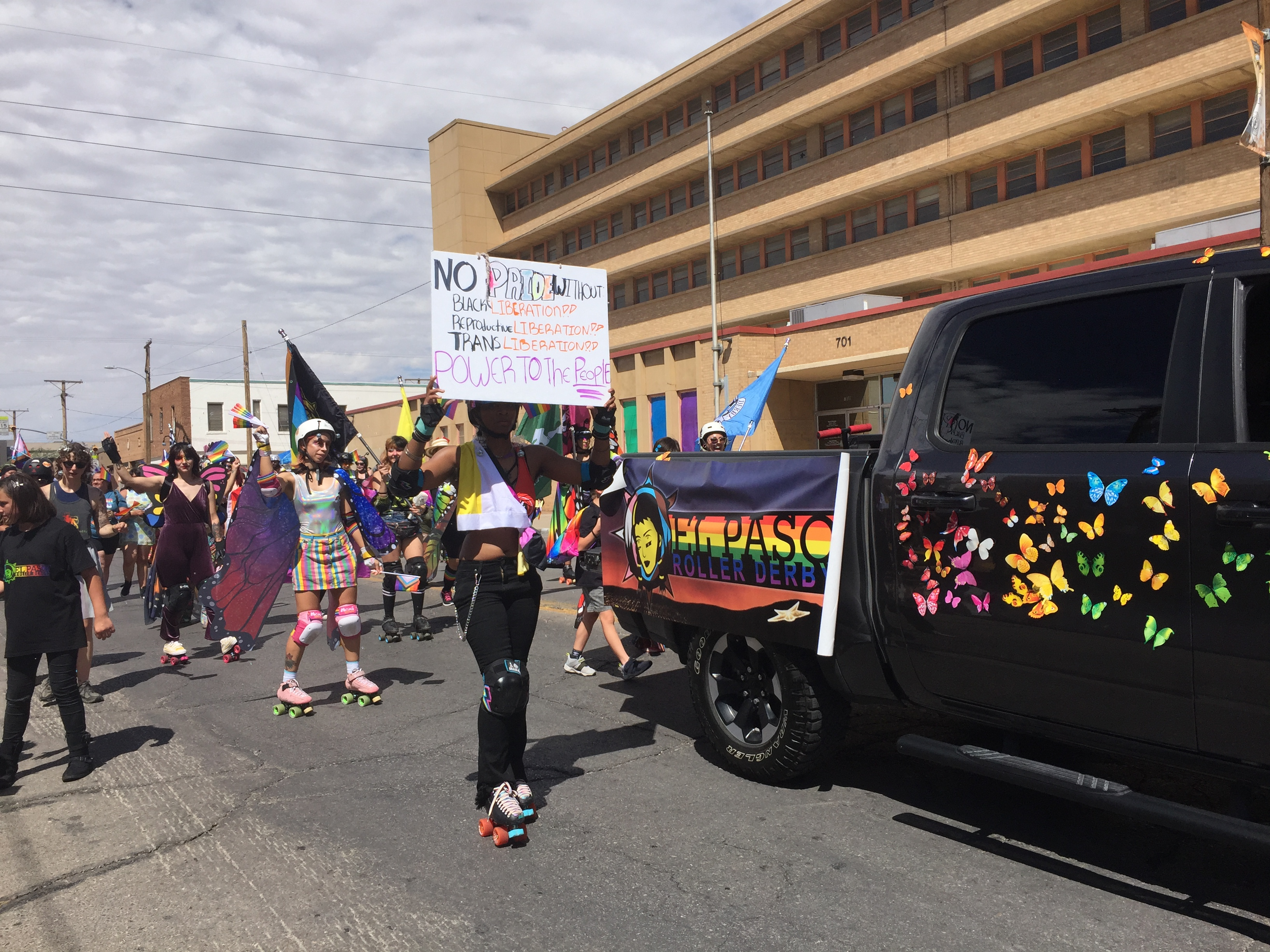
Pride Parade in El Paso, Texas

Many parades still have at least some of the original political or activist character, especially in less accepting settings. The variation is largely dependent upon the political, economic, and religious settings of the area. However, in more accepting cities, the parades take on a festive or even Mardi Gras-like character, whereby the political stage is built on notions of celebration. Large parades often involve floats, dancers, drag queens and amplified music; but even such celebratory parades usually include political and educational contingents, such as local politicians and marching groups from LGBT institutions of various kinds. Other typical parade participants include local LGBT-friendly churches such as Metropolitan Community Churches, United Church of Christ, and Unitarian Universalist Churches, PFLAG, and LGBT employee associations from large businesses.

Even the most festive parades usually offer some aspect dedicated to remembering victims of AIDS and anti-LGBT violence. Some particularly important pride parades are funded by governments and corporate sponsors and promoted as major tourist attractions for the cities that host them. In some countries, some pride parades are now also called Pride Festivals. Some of these festivals provide a carnival-like atmosphere in a nearby park or city-provided closed-off street, with information booths, music concerts, barbecues, beer stands, contests, sports, and games. The 'dividing line' between onlookers and those marching in the parade can be hard to establish in some events, however, in cases where the event is received with hostility, such a separation becomes very obvious. There have been studies considering how the relationship between participants and onlookers is affected by the divide, and how space is used to critique the heteronormative nature of society.

Though the reality was that the Stonewall riots themselves, as well as the immediate and the ongoing political organizing that occurred following them, were events fully participated in by lesbian women, bisexual people and transgender people, as well as by gay men of all races and backgrounds, historically these events were first named Gay, the word at that time being used in a more generic sense to cover the entire spectrum of what is now variously called the 'queer' or LGBT community.

By the late 1970s and early 1980s, as many of the actual participants had grown older, moved on to other issues, or died, this passage of time led to misunderstandings as to who had actually participated in the Stonewall riots, who had actually organized the subsequent demonstrations, marches and memorials, and who had been members of early activist organizations such as Gay Liberation Front and Gay Activists Alliance. The language has become more accurate and inclusive, though these changes met with initial resistance from some in their own communities who were unaware of the historical events. Pride parades are held in many urban areas and in many countries where the urbanization rate is at least 80%.

== Pride events by country ==
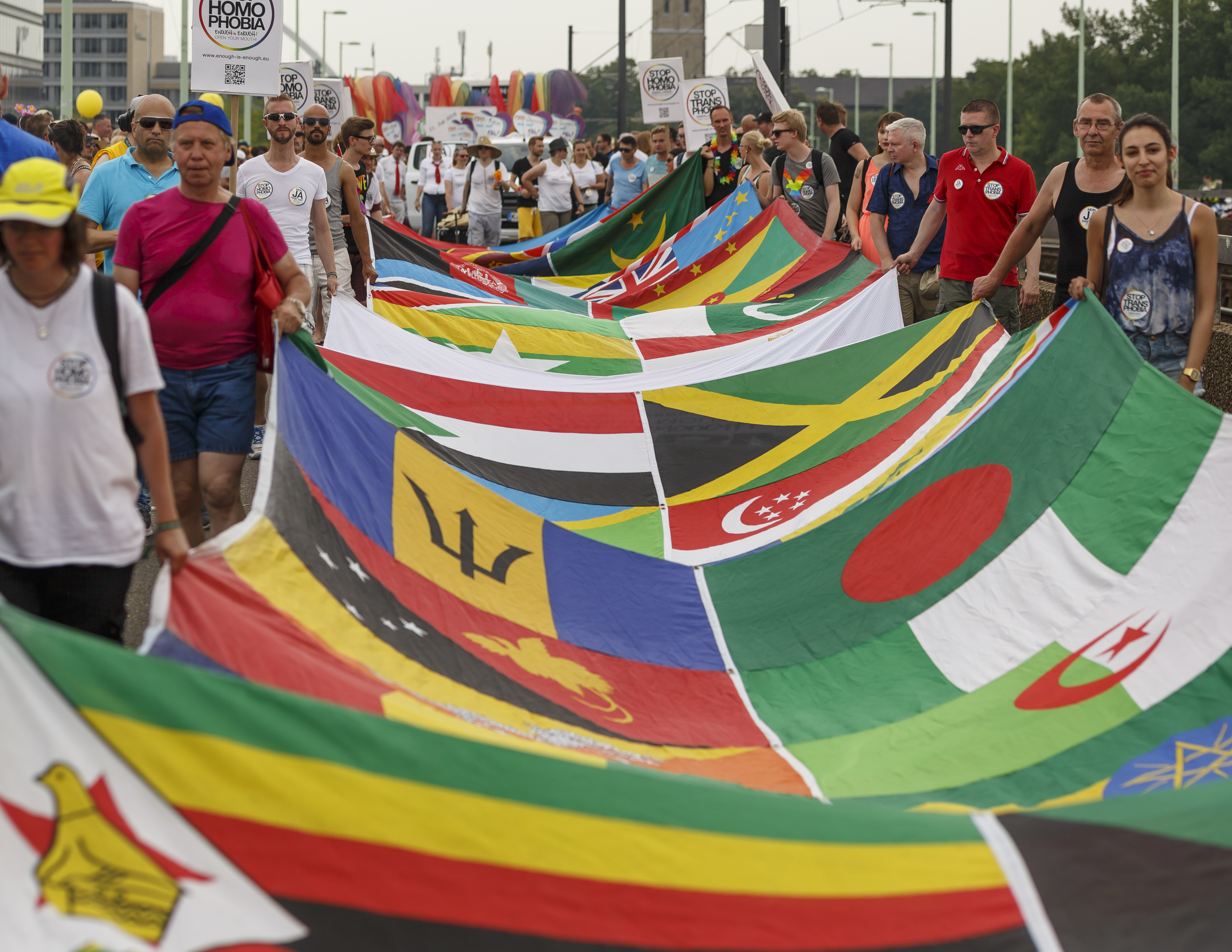
LGBTQ activists at Cologne Pride carrying a banner with the flags of 72 countries with laws against homosexuality

=== Africa ===
==== Malawi ====
On 26 June 2021, the LGBT community in Malawi held its first Pride Parade. The parade was held in the country's capital city, Lilongwe, despite its anti-LGBTQ laws.

==== Mauritius ====
As of June 2006, the Rainbow Parade Mauritius is held every June in Mauritius in the town of Rose Hill. It is organized by the Collective Arc-En-Ciel, a local non-governmental LGBTI rights group, along with some other local non-governmental groups.

==== South Africa ====
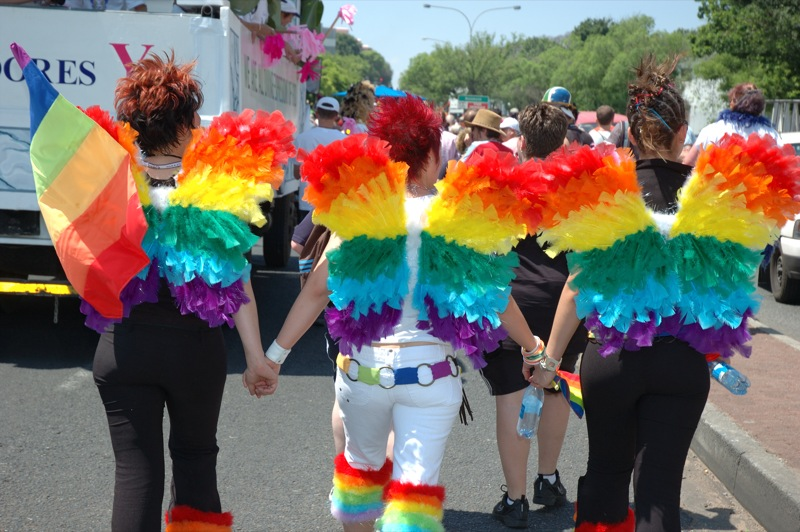
Women marching in Joburg Pride parade in 2006

The first South African pride parade was held towards the end of the apartheid era in Johannesburg on October 13, 1990, the first such event on the African continent. Section Nine of the country's 1996 constitution provides for equality and freedom from discrimination on the grounds of sexual orientation among other factors. The Joburg Pride organizing body disbanded in 2013 due to internal conflict about whether the event should continue to be used for political advocacy. A new committee was formed in May 2013 to organize a "People's Pride", which was "envisioned as an inclusive and explicitly political movement for social justice". Other pride parades held in the Johannesburg area include Soweto Pride which takes place annually in Meadowlands, Soweto, and Ekurhuleni Pride which takes place annually in KwaThema, a township on the East Rand. Pride parades held in other South African cities include the Cape Town Pride parade and Khumbu Lani Pride in Cape Town, Durban Pride in Durban, and Nelson Mandela Bay Pride in Port Elizabeth. Limpopo Pride is held in Polokwane, Limpopo.

==== Uganda ====
In August 2012, the first Ugandan pride parade was held in Entebbe to protest the government's treatment of its LGBT citizens and the attempts by the Ugandan Parliament to adopt harsher sodomy laws, colloquially named the Kill the Gays Bill, which would include life imprisonment for aggravated homosexuality. A second pride parade was held in Entebbe in August 2013. The law was promulgated in December 2013 and subsequently ruled invalid by the Constitutional Court of Uganda on August 1, 2014, on technical grounds. On August 9, 2014, Ugandans held a third pride parade in Entebbe despite indications that the ruling may be appealed and/or the law reintroduced in Parliament and homosexual acts still being illegal in the country.

=== Asia ===
==== East Timor ====
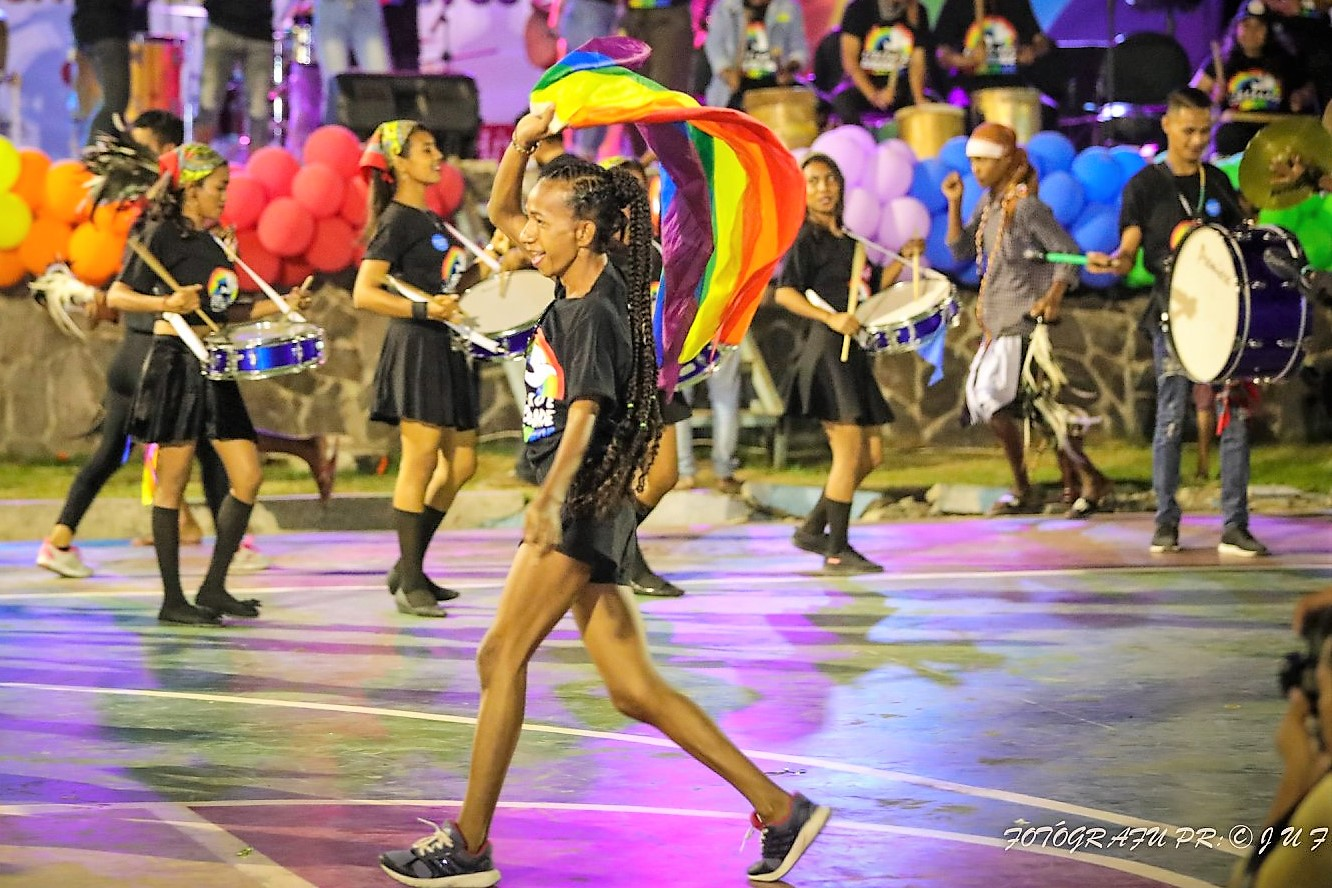
Pride March 2019 in Dili, East Timor

The first pride march in East Timor's capital Dili was held in 2017.

==== Hong Kong ====
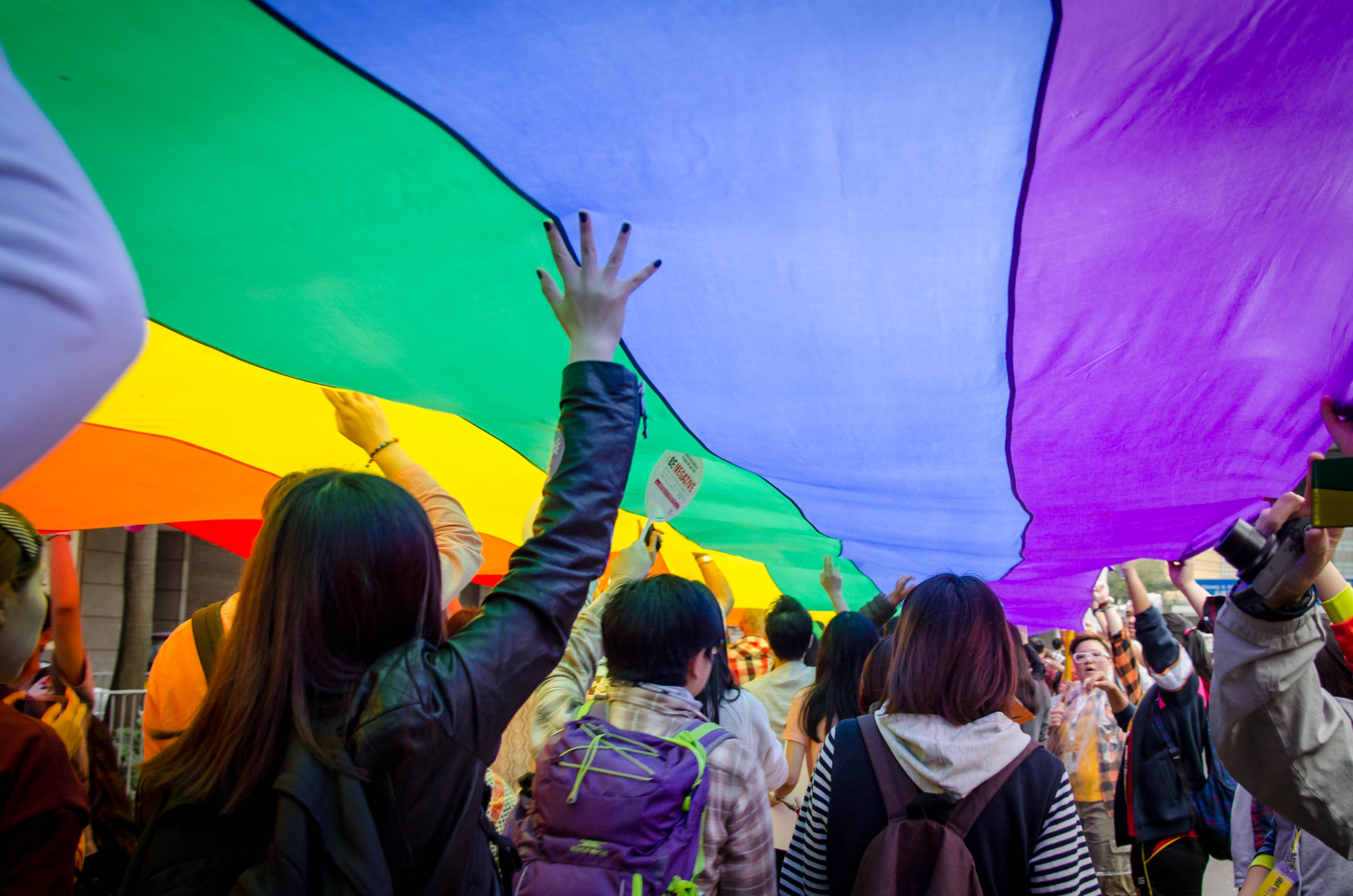
Hong Kong pride parade 2014

The first International Day Against Homophobia pride parade in Hong Kong was held on May 16, 2005, under the theme "Turn Fear into Love", calling for acceptance and care amongst gender and sexual minorities in a diverse and friendly society.

The Hong Kong Pride Parade 2008 boosted the rally count above 1,000 in the second largest East Asian Pride after Taipei's. By now a firmly annual event, Pride 2013 saw more than 5,200 participants. The city continues to hold the event every year, except in 2010 when it was not held due to a budget shortfall.

In the Hong Kong Pride Parade 2018, the event broke its previous record, with 12,000 participants. The police arrested a participant who violated the law of "outraging public decency" by wearing only his underwear in an area of the road cordoned off for the parade.

==== India ====
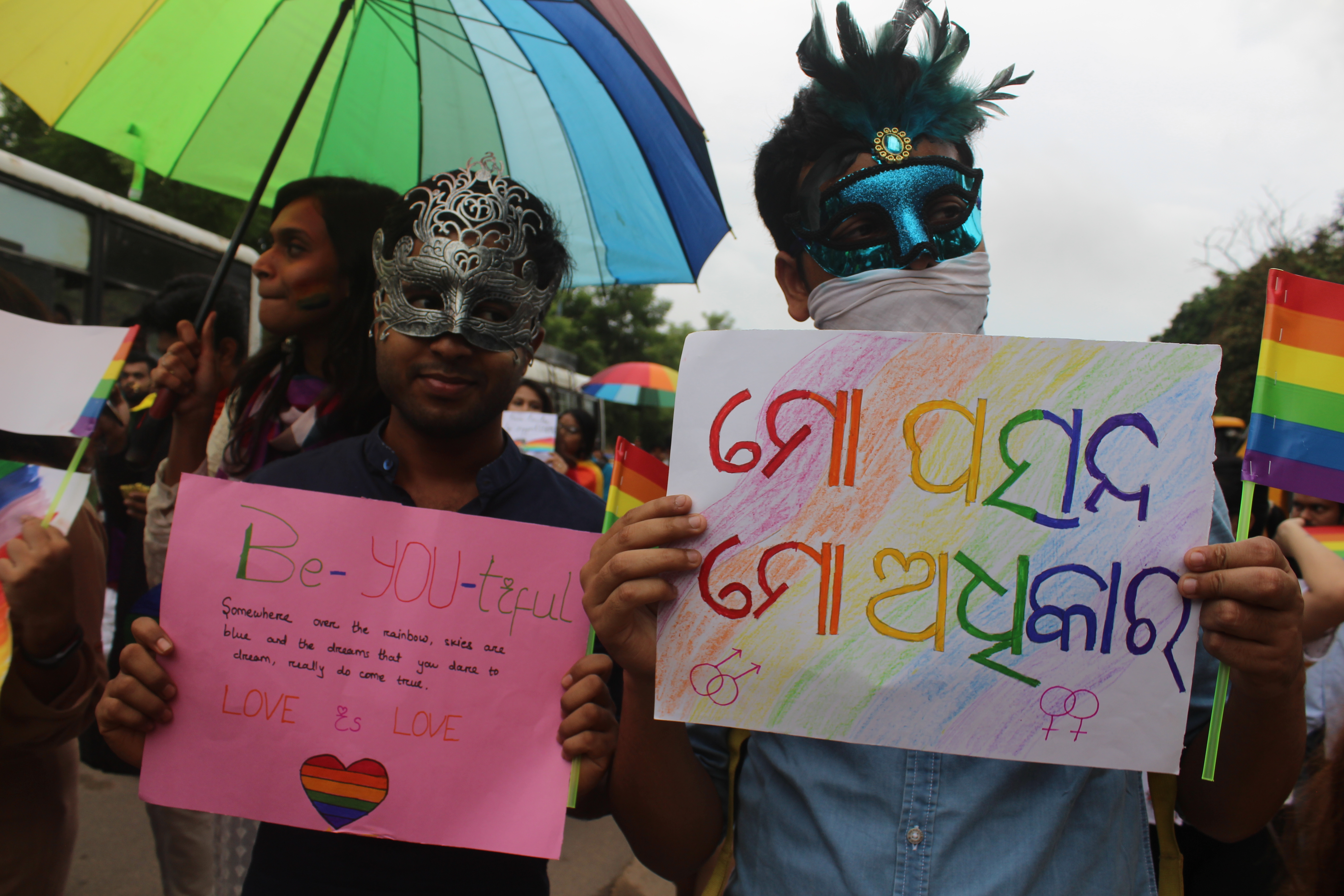
Participants of Bhubaneswar Pride Parade, 2018

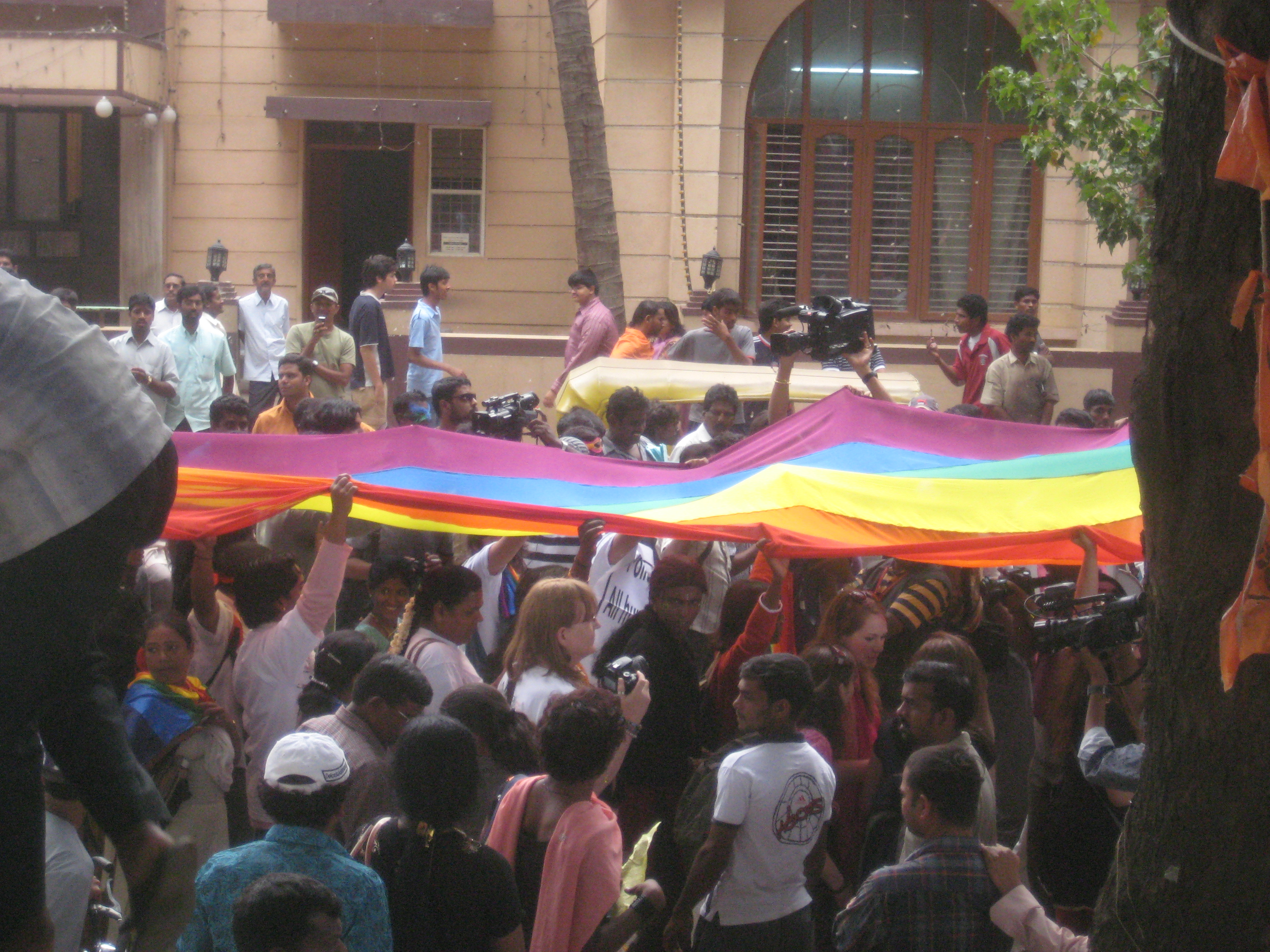
Gay Pride March in Bangalore, India (2013)

On June 29, 2008, four Indian cities (Delhi, Bangalore, Pondicherry, and Kolkata) saw coordinated pride events. About 2,200 people turned up overall. These were also the first pride events of all these cities except Kolkata, which had seen its first such event in 1999 - making it South Asia's first pride walk and then had been organizing pride events every year since 2003 (although there was a gap of a year or so in-between). The pride parades were successful, given that no right-wing group attacked or protested against the pride parade, although the opposition party BJP expressed its disagreement with the concept of gay pride parade. The next day, Prime Minister Manmohan Singh appealed for greater social tolerance towards homosexuals at an AIDS event. On August 16, 2008 (one day after the Independence Day of India), the gay community in Mumbai held its first-ever formal pride parade (although informal pride parades had been held many times earlier), to demand that India's anti-gay laws be amended. A high court in the Indian capital, Delhi ruled on July 2, 2009, that homosexual intercourse between consenting adults was not a criminal act, although the Supreme Court later reversed its decision in 2013 under widespread pressure from powerful conservative and religious groups, leading to the re-criminalization of homosexuality in India. Pride parades have also been held in smaller Indian cities such as Nagpur, Madurai, Bhubaneshwar and Thrissur. Attendance at the pride parades has been increasing significantly since 2008, with an estimated participation of 3,500 people in Delhi and 1,500 people in Bangalore in 2010. On September 6, 2018, sex between same-sex adults was legalized by India's Supreme Court.

===== Tripura =====
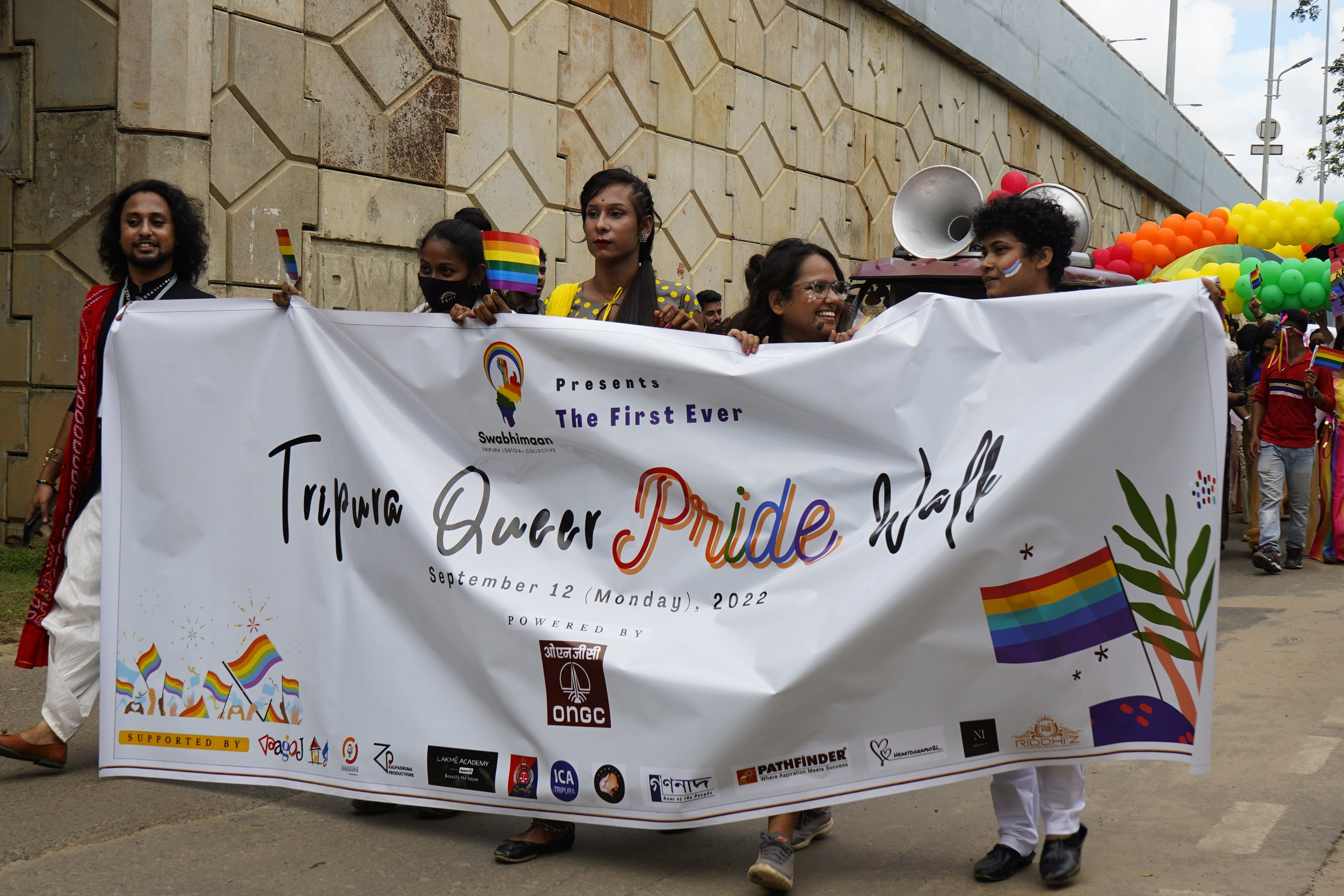
Tripura Queer Pride Walk in 1st Pride Festival in Tripura

On September 12, 2022, Tripura celebrated its first 'Queer Pride Walk' held in Agartala. The major goal of the queer pride parade is to honor and celebrate lesbian, gay, bisexual, and transgender persons, as well as to raise awareness in society so that people can break free from the stigma and biases that surround them. Swabhiman, a non-governmental organization, coordinated the Queer Pride Walk. More than seven months after four transgender people in Tripura had a harrowing experience at a police station that went viral on social media, the state's queer community held its first-ever pride walk on Monday in Agartala, claiming the right to live in dignity and equality, free of gender discrimination, stigma, and taboo for being different. Hundreds of lesbians, gay, bisexual, transgender, and queer (LGBTQ) persons marched in the colorful pride parade, waving rainbow flags and holding banners urging people to reject gender stigma and sexuality stereotypes. 'Swabhiman' President Sneha Gupta Roy asserted the necessity for the state to establish a Transgender Welfare Board to protect the rights of the gay community, adding, "The society must accept us as we are. We, too, are members of society and should not face discrimination. The source of societal biases, discrimination, and injustice directed at us is, surprisingly, a lack of knowledge. We, too, have the right to live with respect and dignity, and in order to do so, the Central Government must work to develop the community's skills and create employment opportunities that will prevent members of the community from resorting to unethical means of income and thus becoming socially marginalized."

==== Israel ====
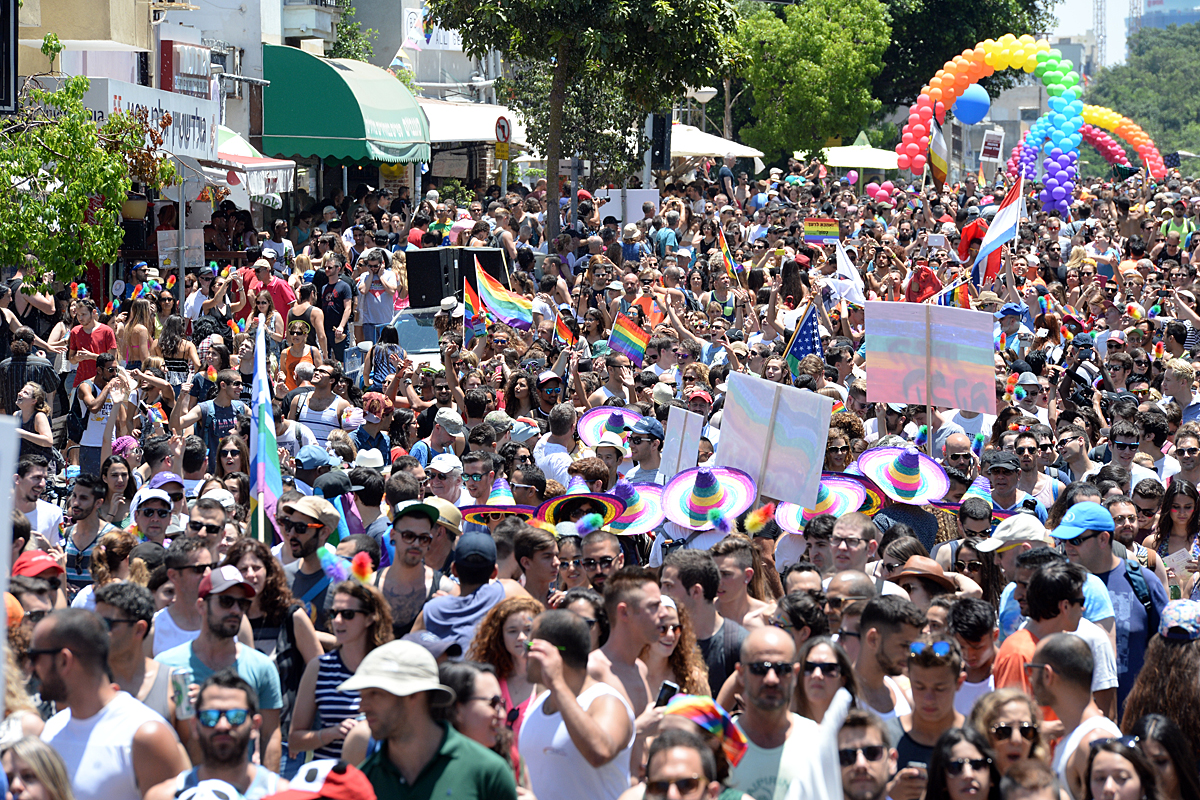
The Tel Aviv Pride Parade is the largest pride parade in Asia

Tel Aviv hosts an annual pride parade, attracting more than 260,000 people, making it the largest LGBT pride event in Asia. Three Pride parades took place in Tel Aviv on the week of June 11, 2010. The main parade, which is also partly funded by the city's municipality, was one of the largest ever to take place in Israel, with approximately 200,000 participants. The first Pride parade in Tel Aviv took place in 1993.

On June 30, 2005, the fourth annual Pride march of Jerusalem took place. The Jerusalem parade has been met with resistance due to the high presence of religious bodies in the city. It had originally been prohibited by a municipal ban which was canceled by the court. Many of the religious leaders of Jerusalem's Muslim, Jewish, and Christian communities had arrived at a rare consensus asking the municipal government to cancel the permit of the parades.

Another parade, this time billed as an international event, was scheduled to take place in the summer of 2005, but was postponed to 2006 due to the stress on police forces during the summer of Israel's unilateral disengagement plan. In 2006, it was again postponed due to the Israel–Hezbollah war. It was scheduled to take place in Jerusalem on November 10, 2006, caused a wave of protests by Haredi Jews around central Israel. The Israel National Police had filed a petition to cancel the parade due to foreseen strong opposition. Later, an agreement was reached to convert the parade into an assembly inside the Hebrew University stadium in Jerusalem. June 21, 2007, the Jerusalem Open House organization succeeded in staging a parade in central Jerusalem after police allocated thousands of personnel to secure the general area. The rally planned afterwards was canceled due to an unrelated national fire brigade strike which prevented proper permits from being issued. The parade was postponed once more in 2014, as a result of Protective Edge Operation.

In 2022 local environmentalists from Tel Aviv started planning how to make the current year's parade and future parades more sustainable, using composting stations and removing single use plastic from the largest pride parade in the Middle East.

==== Japan ====
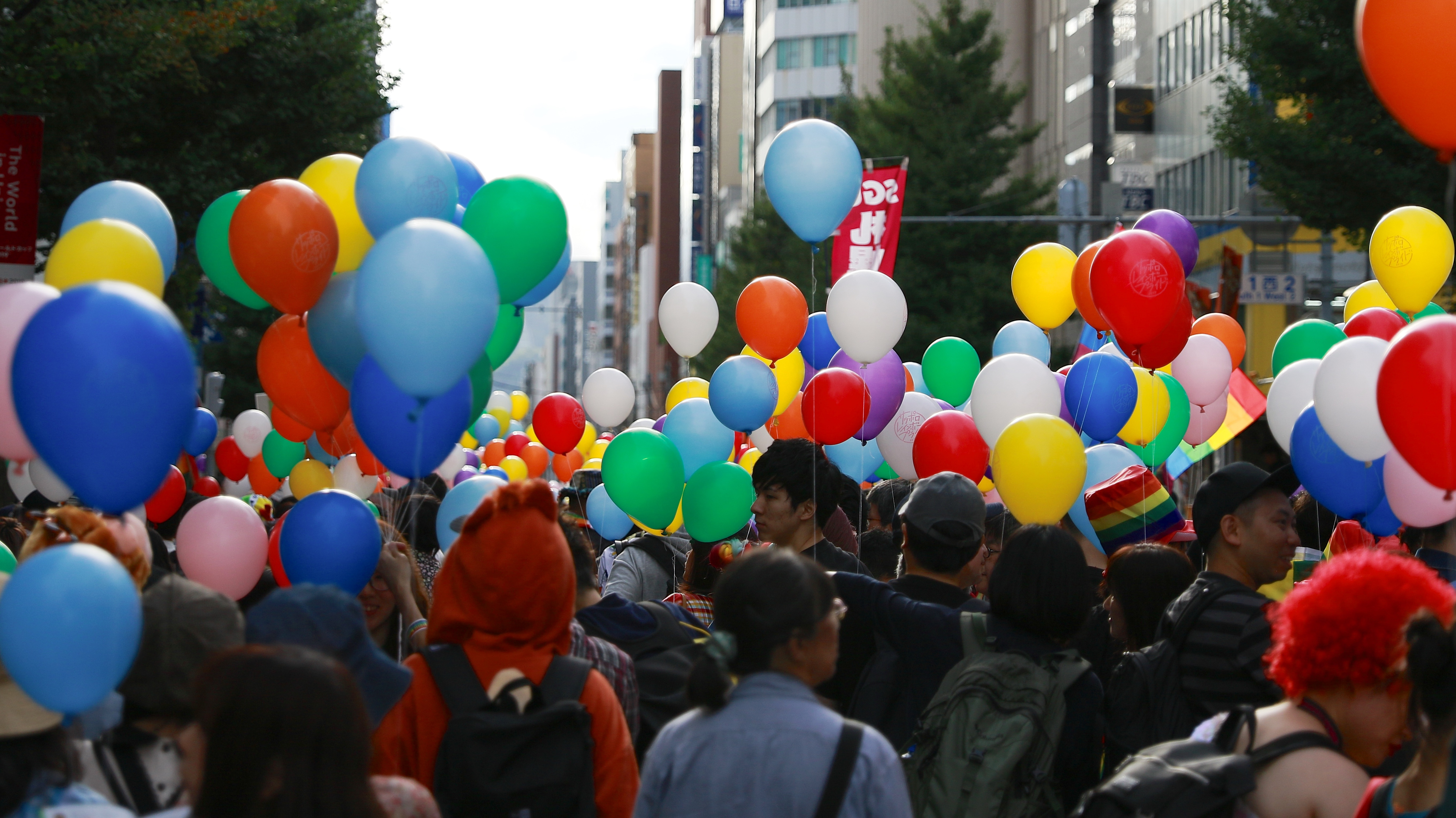
Pride parade in Sapporo, Japan

The first Pride Parade in Japan was held on August 28, 1994, in Tokyo (while the names were not Pride Parade until 2007). In 2005, an administrative institution, the Tokyo Pride was founded to have Pride Parade constantly every year. In May 2011, Tokyo Pride was dissolved and most of the original management went on to found Tokyo Rainbow Pride.

==== Lebanon ====
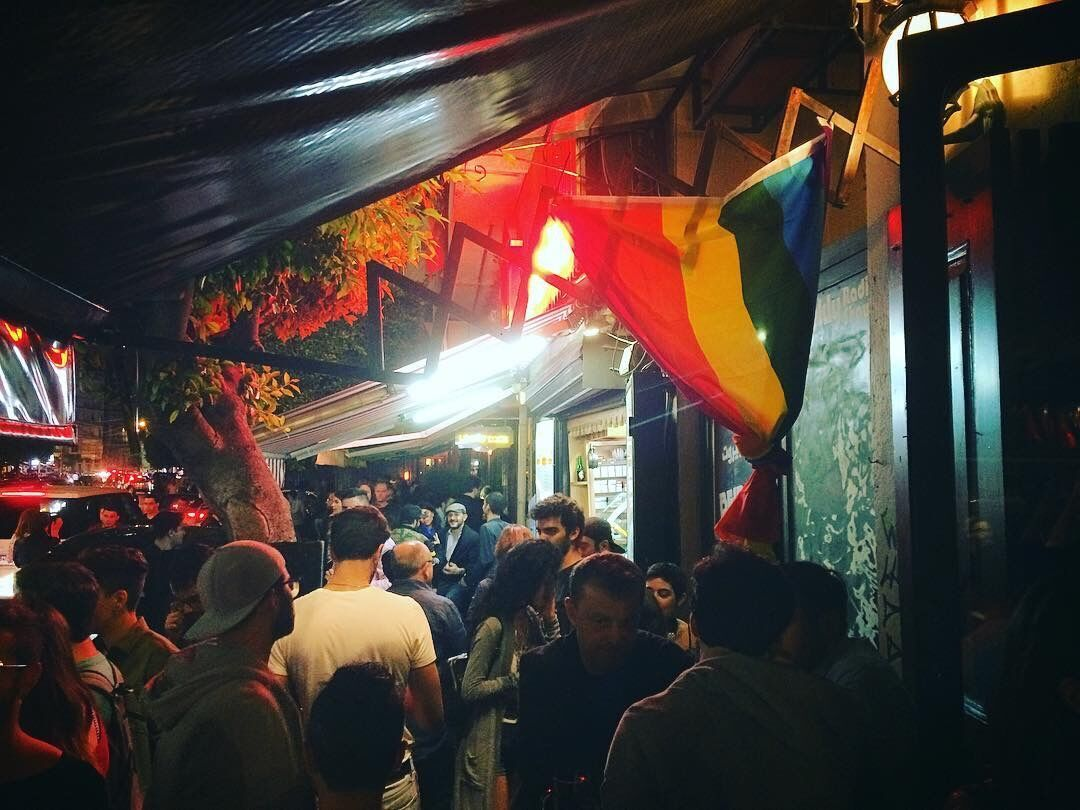
A rainbow flag flying in Mar Mkhayel, Beirut on May 20, 2017

Beirut Pride is the annual non-profit LGBTIQ+ pride event and militant march held in Beirut, the capital of the Lebanon, working to decriminalize homosexuality in Lebanon. Since its inception in 2017, Beirut Pride has been the first and only LGBTIQ+ pride in the arabophone world, and its largest LGBTIQ+ event. It has been the topic of four MA theses, one post-doctoral research and six documentaries, so far covered in 17 languages in 350 articles. Its first installment gathered 4,000 persons, and 2,700 people participated in the first three days of its 2018 edition, before the police cracked it down and arrested its founder Hadi Damien. The next day, the prosecutor of Beirut suspended the scheduled activities, and initiated criminal proceedings against Hadi for organizing events "that incite to debauchery". Beirut Pride holds annual events adapted to the current circumstances in the country.

==== South Korea ====
Queer Culture Festivals in South Korea consist of pride parades and various other LGBT events, such as film festivals. Currently there are eight Queer Culture Festivals, including Seoul Queer Culture Festival (since 2000), Daegu Queer Culture Festival (since 2009), Busan Queer Culture Festival (since 2017), Jeju Queer Culture Festival (since 2017), Jeonju Queer Culture Festival (since 2018), Gwangju Queer Culture Festival (since 2018), Incheon Queer Culture Festival (since 2018), and Daejeon Queer Culture Festival (since 2024).

==== Nepal ====
Nepal Pride Parade is organized on June 29 every year. There are also Pride Parades organized by Blue Diamond Society and Mitini Nepal. A youth-led pride parade which uses broader umbrella terms as Queer and MOGAI, is organized by Queer Youth Group and Queer Rights Collective. Blue Diamond Society's rally on Gai Jatra is technically not considered as a Pride Parade. Mitini Nepal organizes Pride Parades on Feb 14 while, a Queer Womxn Pride is also organized on International Women's Day.

==== Philippines ====
In 1992, the Lesbian Collective marched during the International Women's Day celebrations, and participated in the program after negotiations with organizers.

In 1993, UP Babaylan, an LGBT student support group, participated in the University of the Philippines Diliman's Lantern Parade. Thanks to the positive reception from this march, members of UP Babaylan would participate in future Lantern Parades.

On June 26, 1994, to celebrate the 25th anniversary of the Stonewall Riots, Progressive Organization of Gays in the Philippines (Pro Gay Philippines) and Metropolitan Community Church (MCC) Manila organized the first LGBT Pride March in Philippines, marching from EDSA corner Quezon Avenue to Quezon City Memorial Circle (Quezon City, Metro Manila, Philippines) and highlighting broad social issues. At Quezon City Memorial Circle, a program was held with a Queer Pride Mass and solidarity remarks from various organizations and individuals.

In 1995, Pro Gay Philippines and MCC did not lead a pride parade. In 1996, 1997 and 1998 large and significant marches were organized and produced by Reach Out AIDS Foundation, all of which were held in Malate, Manila, Philippines. These pride parades were organized a celebration of gay pride, but also were parading to raise awareness for discrimination and the misinformation surrounding AIDS.

In 1999, Reach Out Aids Foundation handed its organization to a newly formed Task Force Pride Philippines (TFP), a network of LGBT and LGBT-friendly groups and individuals seeking to promote positive visibility for the LGBT community. In 2003, the Pride March was moved from June to the December Human Rights Week to coincide with related human rights activities such as World AIDS Day (December 1), Philippine National Lesbian Day (December 8), and International Human Rights Day (December 10). TFP organized the pride parades for two decades before the Metro Manila Pride organization assumed the responsibility in 2016.

On December 10, 2005, the First LGBT Freedom March, with the theme "CPR: Celebrating Pride and Rights" was held along the streets of España and Quiapo in Manila, Philippines. Concerned that the prevailing economic and political crisis in the country at the time presented threats to freedoms and liberties of all Filipinos, including sexual and gender minorities, LGBT individuals and groups, non-government organizations and members of various communities and sectors organized the LGBT Freedom March calling for systemic and structural change. At historic Plaza Miranda, in front of Quiapo Church, despite the pouring rain, a program with performances and speeches depicting LGBT pride was held soon after the march.

In 2007, the first transgender women's group participated in the Metro Manila Pride March.

On December 6, 2014, Philippines celebrated the 20th anniversary of the Metro Manila Pride March with the theme: Come Out for Love Kasi Pag-ibig Pa Rin (Come Out for Love Because It's Still All About Love). The theme is a reminder of the love and passion that started and sustained 20 years of taking to the streets for the recognition and respect of LGBT lives as human lives. It is also a celebration of and an invitation for families, friends, and supporters of LGBT people to claim Metro Manila Pride as a safe space to voice their support for the community, for the LGBT human rights advocacy, and for the people they love and march with every year.

==== Singapore ====
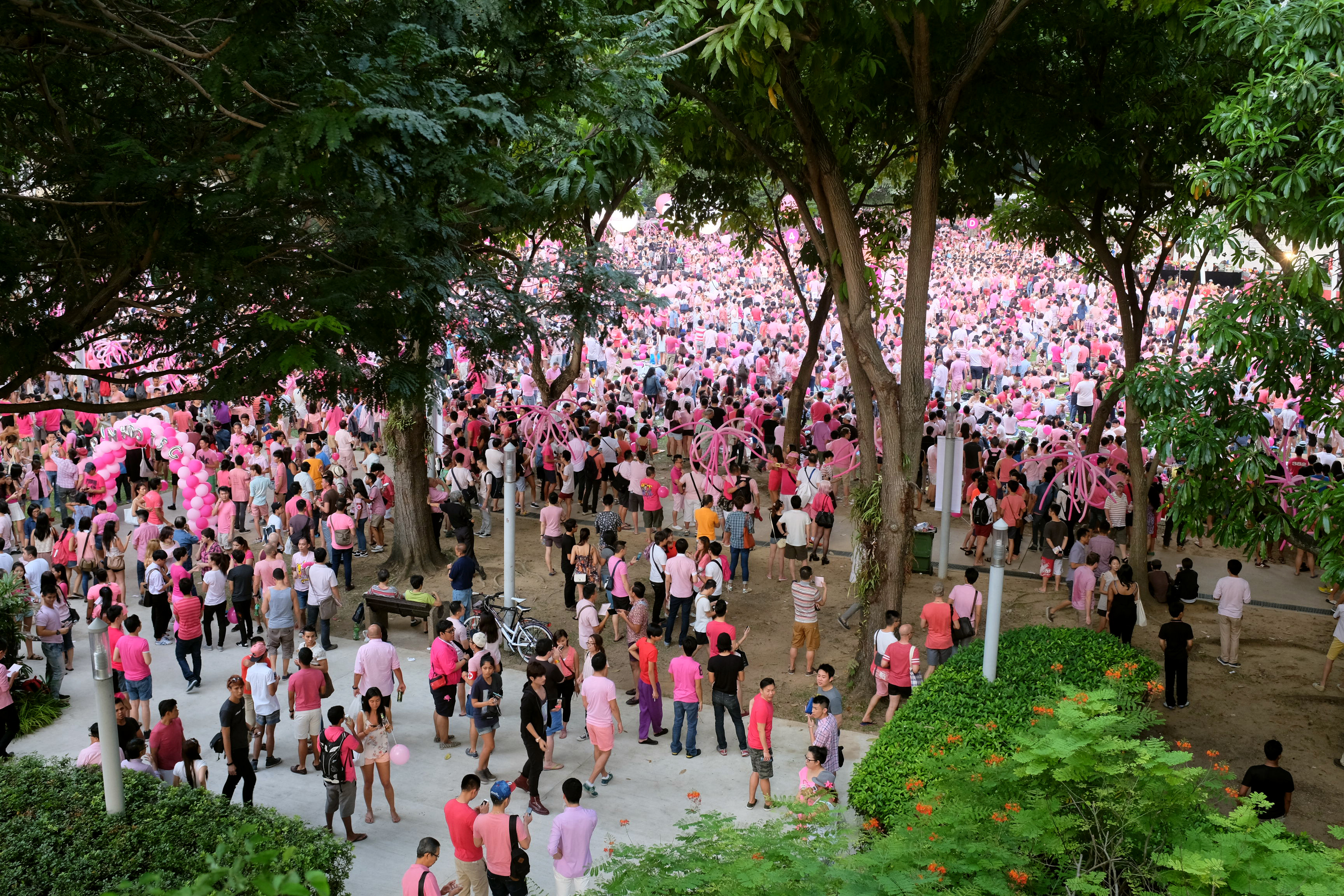
Pink Dot SG 2014, at Hong Lim Park, Singapore

A pride parade known as Pink Dot SG has been held in Singapore since 2009 with increasing attendance amounting to the tens of thousands. There are often held in either June or July. It is one of the largest such pride events in Southeast Asia, with attendance reaching up to 35,000.

==== Taiwan ====
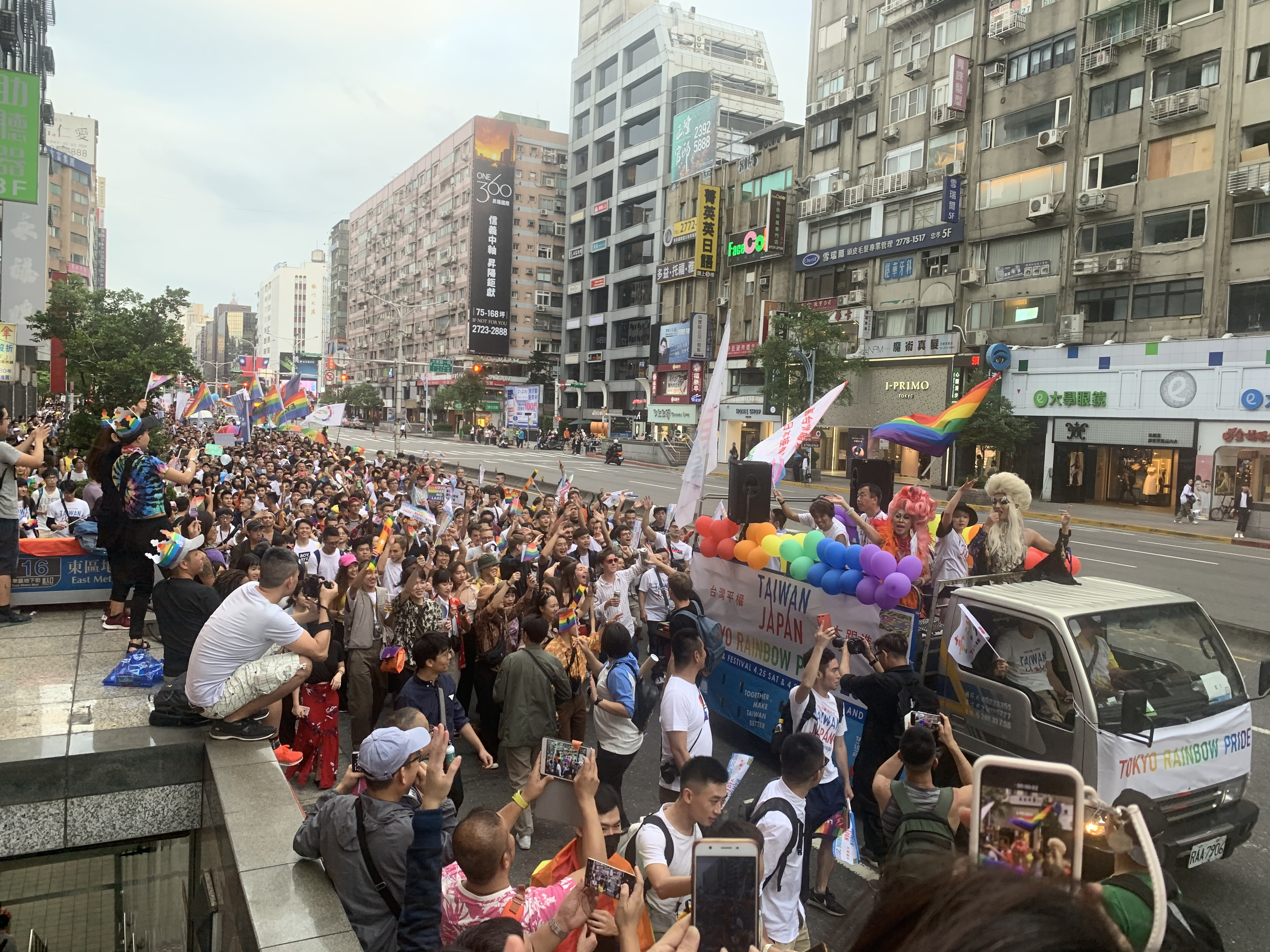
Taiwan Pride 2019, in Taipei

Taipei hosts an annual Gay Pride Parade in October. Recently in 2019, the 17th Taiwan LGBT parade is the first gay parade after Taiwan 's same-sex marriage legislation, with attendances of over 200,000, which the largest such event in East Asia.

On November 1, 2003, the first Taiwan Pride was held in Taipei with over 1,000 people attending. The parade held in September 2008 attracted around 18,000 attendances. After 2008, the numbers grew rapidly. In 2009, around 5,000 people under the slogan "Love out loud" (Chinese: 同志愛很大). In 2010, despite bad weather conditions the Taiwan gay parade "Out and Vote" attracted more than 30,000 people. Other parades take place at cities throughout Taiwan in: Kaohsiung, Taichung, Tainan, Yilan, Hsinchu and East of Taiwan. In 2022, 120,000 people participated in the Taipei Pride march.

==== Thailand ====
The first-ever Bangkok Pride parade occurred on June 6, 2022. The third edition occurred on June 30, 2024.

==== Vietnam ====
On August 3, 2012, the first LGBT Viet Pride event was held in Hanoi, Vietnam with indoor activities such as film screenings, research presentations, and a bicycle rally on August 5, 2012, that attracted almost 200 people riding to support the LGBT cause. Viet Pride has since expanded, now taking place in 17 cities and provinces in Vietnam in the first weekend of August, attracting around 700 bikers in 2014 in Hanoi, and was reported on many mainstream media channels.

=== Europe ===
==== Albania ====
The first Tirana pride parade was held in 2012 and has been held annually ever since. On 25 May 2024, the 12th Tirana pride was held.

==== Belgium ====
The first pride parade was The Belgian Pride, which evolved into the Brussels Pride, while Antwerp got its own Antwerp Pride. Apart from these two largest ones, there are smaller ones like the Limburg Pride in Hasselt. In 2026 a canal pride was held in Mechelen for the first time.

==== Bosnia and Herzegovina ====
The first Pride parade in Bosnia and Herzegovina was held on 8 September 2019 in Sarajevo under the slogan Ima Izać' (Coming Out). Around 4000 people, including foreign diplomats, members of the local government and celebrities participated amidst a strong police presence. According to a 2021 study, the first LGBT+ Pride parade in Sarajevo led to increased support for LGBT activism in Sarajevo.

==== Bulgaria ====
Like the other countries from the Balkans, Bulgaria's population is very conservative when it comes to issues like sexuality. Although homosexuality was decriminalized in 1968, people with different sexual orientations and identities are still not well accepted in society. In 2003 the country enacted several laws protecting the LGBTQ community and individuals from discrimination. In 2008, Bulgaria organized its first ever pride parade. The almost 200 people who had gathered were attacked by skinheads, but police managed to prevent any injuries. The 2009 pride parade, with the motto "Rainbow Friendship" attracted more than 300 participants from Bulgaria and tourists from Greece and Great Britain. There were no disruptions and the parade continued as planned. A third Pride parade took place successfully in 2010, with close to 800 participants and an outdoor concert event.

==== Croatia ====
The first pride parade in Croatia was held on 29 June 2002 in Zagreb and has been held annually ever since. The attendance has gradually grown from 350 in 2002 to over 15,000 in 2013. Pride parades are also held in Split (since 2011) and Osijek (since 2014).

==== Czech Republic ====
The Prague Pride festival first took place in 2011. Before it, Pride Parades took place in several other cities in the Czech Republic, but nowhere did they turn into a regular tradition. The first year was attended by 8,000 people. Since then, the number of participants has increased. Prior to the COVID-19 pandemic, the festival week and accompanying events attracted approximately 90,000 visitors, while around 40,000 people attended the annual parade. Due to the COVID-19 pandemic, the 2020 parade was replaced with a Rainbow Cruise. In 2022, the parade returned and attracted a record 60,000 participants.

==== Denmark ====
The Copenhagen Pride festival is held every year in August. In its current format, it has been held every year since 1996, where Copenhagen hosted EuroPride. Before 1994 the national LGBT association organised demonstration-like freedom marches. Copenhagen Pride is a colourful and festive occasion, combining political issues with concerts, films and a parade. The focal point is the City Hall Square in the city centre. It usually opens on the Wednesday of Pride Week, culminating on the Saturday with a parade and Denmark's Mr Gay contest. In 2017, some 25,000 people took part in the parade with floats and flags, and about 300,000 were out in the streets to experience it.

The smaller Aarhus Pride in held every year in June in the Jutlandic city of Aarhus.

==== Estonia ====
The Baltic Pride event was held in Tallinn in 2011, 2014 and 2017.

==== Finland ====
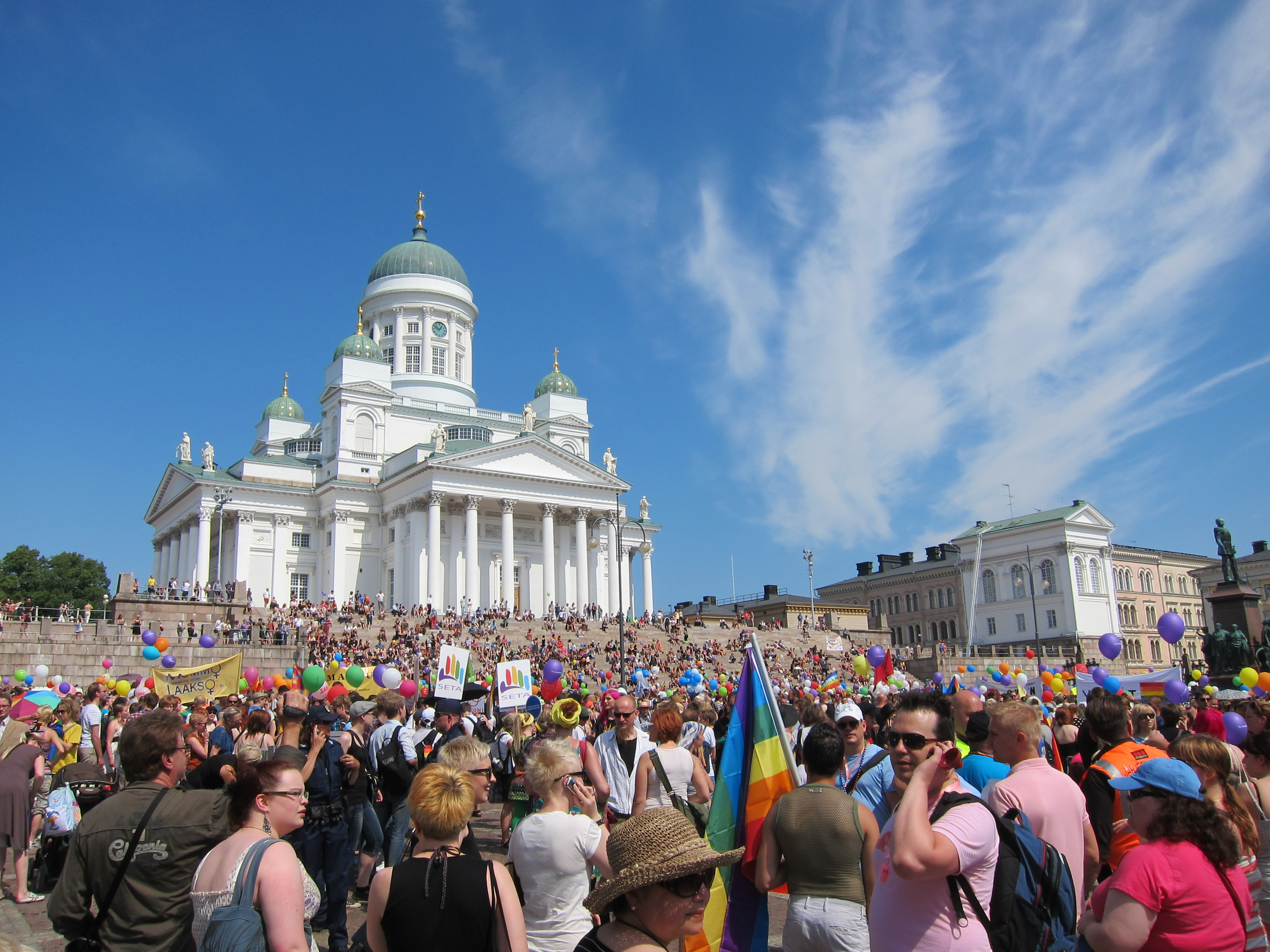
Senate Square, Helsinki, 2011 Helsinki Pride parade

The Helsinki Pride was first organized in 1975 and called Freedom Day. It has grown into one of the biggest Nordic Pride events. Between 20,000 and 30,000 people participate in the Pride and its events annually, including a number of international participants from the Baltic countries and Russia. There have been a few incidents over the years, the most serious one being a gas and pepper spray attack in 2010 hitting around 30 parade participants, among those children. Three men were later arrested.

In addition to Helsinki, several other Finnish cities such as Tampere, Turku, Lahti, Oulu and Rovaniemi have hosted their own Pride events. Even small Savonian town of Kangasniemi with just 5,000 inhabitants hosted their own Pride first time in 2015.

==== France ====
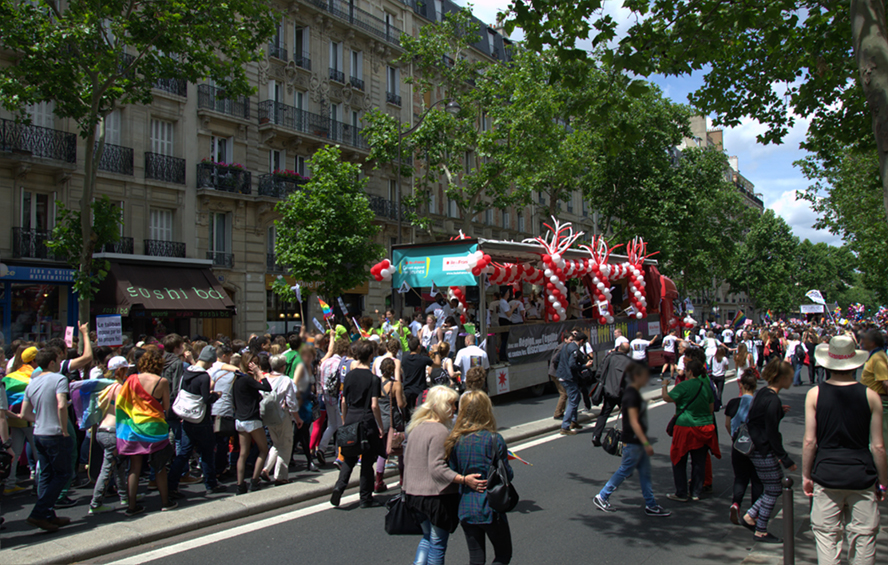
Paris Pride

Paris Pride hosts an annual Gay Pride Parade last Saturday in June, with attendances of over 800,000. Eighteen other parades take place at cities throughout France in: Angers, Biarritz, Bayonne, Bordeaux, Caen, Le Mans, Lille, Lyon, Marseille, Montpellier, Nancy, Nantes, Nice, Paris, Rennes, Rouen, Strasbourg, Toulouse and Tours.

==== Germany ====
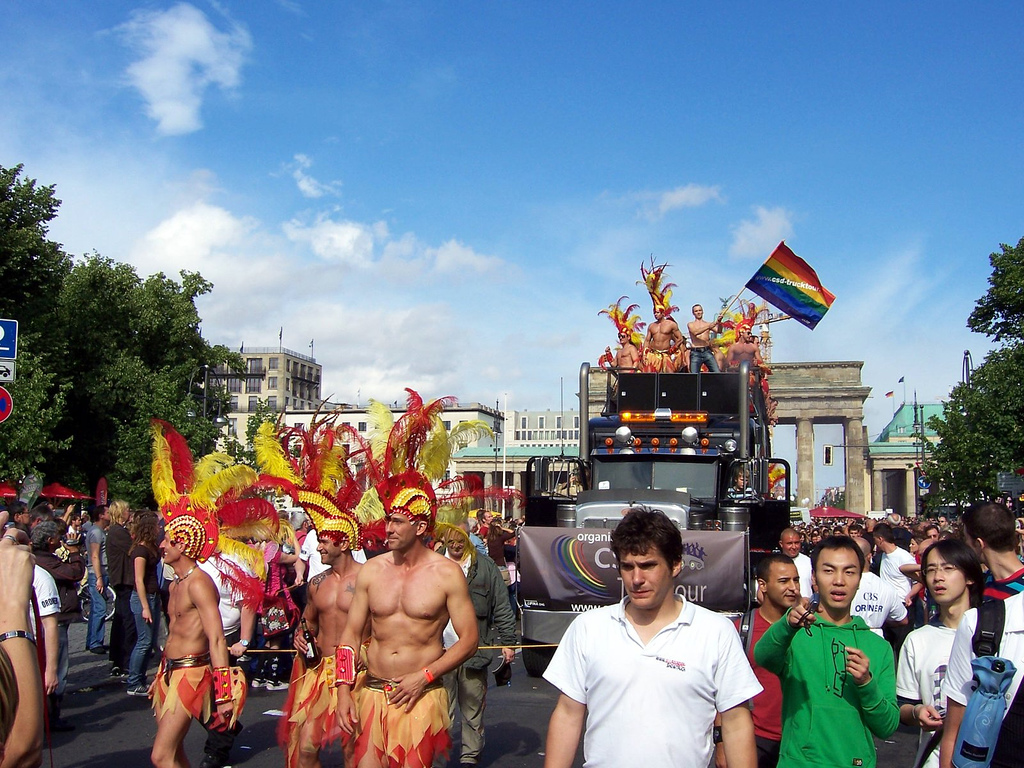
Berlin Pride

Both Berlin Pride and Cologne Pride claim to be one of the biggest in Europe. The first so-called Gay Freedom Day took place on June 30, 1979, in both cities. Berlin Pride parade is now held every year the last Saturday in July. Cologne Pride celebrates two weeks of supporting cultural programme prior to the parade taking place on Sunday of the first July weekend. An alternative march used to be on the Saturday prior to the Cologne Pride parade, but now takes place a week earlier. Pride parades in Germany are often called Christopher Street Days - named after the street where the Stonewall Inn was located.

==== Greece ====
In Greece, endeavours were made during the 1980s and 1990s to organise such an event, but it was not until 2005 that Athens Pride was established. The Athens Pride is held every June in the centre of Athens city. As of 2012, there is a second pride parade taking place in the city of Thessaloniki. The Thessaloniki Pride is also held annually every June. 2015 and 2016 brought two more pride parades, the Crete Pride taking place annually in Crete and the Patras Pride, that was held in Patras for the first time in June 2016.

==== Greenland ====
In May 2010, Nuuk celebrated its first pride parade. Over 1,000 people attended. It has been repeated every year since then, part of a festival called Nuuk Pride.

==== Iceland ====
First held in 1999, Reykjavík Pride celebrated its 20th anniversary in 2019. Held in early August each year, the event attracts up to 100,000 participants – approaching a third of Iceland's population.

==== Ireland ====
The Dublin Pride Festival usually takes place in June. The Festival involves the Pride Parade, the route of which is from O'Connell Street to Merrion Square. However, the route was changed for the 2017 Parade due to Luas Cross City works. The parade attracts thousands of people who line the streets each year. It gained momentum after the 2015 Marriage Equality Referendum.

A separate annual pride march, Trans & Intersex Pride Dublin has also gained large crowds of supporters Trans & Intersex Pride Dublin marches with the goal of bringing pride back to its radical roots of protest and for better access to gender affirming care in Ireland.

==== Italy ====
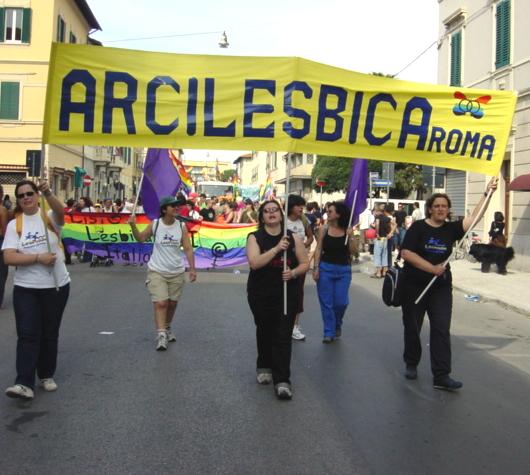
Italian lesbian organisation Arcilesbica at the National Italian Gay Pride march in Grosseto, Italy, in 2004

The first public demonstration within the LGBT community in Italy took place in San Remo on April 5, 1972, as a protest against the International Congress on Sexual Deviance organized by the Catholic-inspired Italian Center of Sexology. The event was attended by about forty people belonging to various homophile groups, including ones from France, Belgium, Great Britain's Gay Liberation Front, and Italy's activist homosexual rights group Fuori!.

The first Italian event specifically associated with international celebrations of Gay Pride was the sixth congress of Fuori! held in Turin in late June 1978 and included a week of films on gay subjects. Episodes of violence against homosexuals were frequent in Italy, such as in the summer of 1979 when two young gay men were killed in Livorno. In Pisa in November of that year, the Orfeo Collective organized the first march against anti-gay violence. Around 500 gay and lesbian participants attended, and this remained the largest gathering of the kind until 1994.

Later, a system of "national Pride" observances designated one city to hold the official events, starting with Rome in 1994. Starting in 2013, the organization Onda Pride organized additional events, and in 2019 events were organized in 39 cities nationwide.

==== Kosovo ====
Events celebrating the International Day Against Homophobia, Biphobia and Transphobia have been organized in Kosovo since 2007. The first pride parade occurred in Pristina in May 2017, with attendance from President Hashim Thaçi and British and American diplomats. The annual Pride Week has been held in Pristina since 2017. In 2018, Mayor Shpend Ahmeti participated. During the event's third edition in October 2019, participants started at the Skanderbeg Square, making their way down Mother Teresa Boulevard to Zahir Pajaziti Square, passing the government and parliament buildings and other landmarks of the city, with the slogan "Whoever your heart beats for" (Për kon t'rreh zemra). The events have been held without incidence, and consist of various artistic exhibitions, parties, conferences, discussions and a parade.

==== Latvia ====
On July 22, 2005, the first Latvian gay pride march took place in Riga, surrounded by protesters. It had previously been banned by the Riga City Council, and the then-Prime Minister of Latvia, Aigars Kalvītis, opposed the event, stating Riga should "not promote things like that", however a court decision allowed the march to go ahead. In 2006, LGBT people in Latvia attempted a Parade but were assaulted by "No Pride" protesters, an incident sparking a storm of international media pressure and protests from the European Parliament at the failure of the Latvian authorities to adequately protect the Parade so that it could proceed. In 2007, following international pressure, a Pride Parade was held once again in Riga with 4,500 people parading around Vērmane Garden, protected physically from "No Pride" protesters by 1,500 Latvian police, with ringing the inside and the outside of the iron railings of the park. Two fire crackers were detonated with one being thrown from outside at the end of the festival as participants were moving off to the buses. A man and his son were afterwards arrested by the police. This caused some alarm but no injury, although participants did have to run the gauntlet of "No Pride" abuse as they ran to the buses. They were driven to a railway station on the outskirts of Riga, from where they went to a post Pride "relax" at the seaside resort of Jūrmala. Participants included MEPs, Amnesty International observers and random individuals who travelled from abroad to support LGBT Latvians and their friends and families.

In 2008, the Riga Pride was held in the historically potent 11. novembra krastmala (November 11 Embankment) beneath the Riga Castle. The participants heard speeches from MEPs and a message of support from the Latvian President. The embankment was not open and was isolated from the public with some participants having trouble getting past police cordons. About 300 No Pride protesters gathered on the bridges behind barricades erected by the police who kept Pride participants and the "No Pride" protesters separated. Participants were once more "bused" out but this time a 5-minute journey to central Riga.

In 2009, the annual Baltic Pride was launched, with the first edition being held in Riga with a march. This event and the following ones have been held without serious incidents.

The 2012 Baltic Pride was held on June 2. The parade marched through Tērbatas street from the corner of Ģertrūdes street towards Vērmane Garden, where concerts and a conference were held. The events were attended by the United States Ambassador to Latvia Judith Garber and the Latvian Minister of Foreign Affairs, Edgars Rinkēvičs.

In 2015, Riga hosted the pan-European EuroPride event with about 5000 participants engaging in approximately 50 cultural and entertainment events.

The Baltic Pride event returned to Riga in 2018, the year of the centenary of the independence of Latvia and all three Baltic states. An estimated 8000 people took part. The events took place for 100 days from March 3 to June 10 with the parade being held through the city on June 9.

==== Lithuania ====
In Lithuania, the first Pride March took place on May 8, 2010, in the city of Vilnius. The event's preparation was marked by strong political and legal resistance. Several conservative members of parliament attempted to have the march banned at the last minute. Approximately 300 to 400 people participated in this peaceful march. Due to the large number of counter-protesters, nearly a thousand police officers were deployed to maintain order. The event is considered a historic moment in Lithuania and launched the Baltic Pride cycle, which has since been held annually in one of the Baltic countries (Lithuania, Latvia, and Estonia).

Meanwhile, the Lithuanian Gay League, a national LGBT rights organization, organizes Lithuanian Pride every year in Vilnius. Over several days, events such as concerts and international conferences are held alongside the Pride March. Today, Lithuanian Pride is a powerful symbol of progress. On June 7, 2025, Vilnius hosted the most significant event of the year for the LGBTQ+ community in Lithuania – the Baltic Pride March for Equality. The main event of the Baltic Pride festival drew an unprecedented 20,000 participants, marking the largest gathering in the history of Lithuania's LGBTQ+ rights movement.

==== Netherlands ====
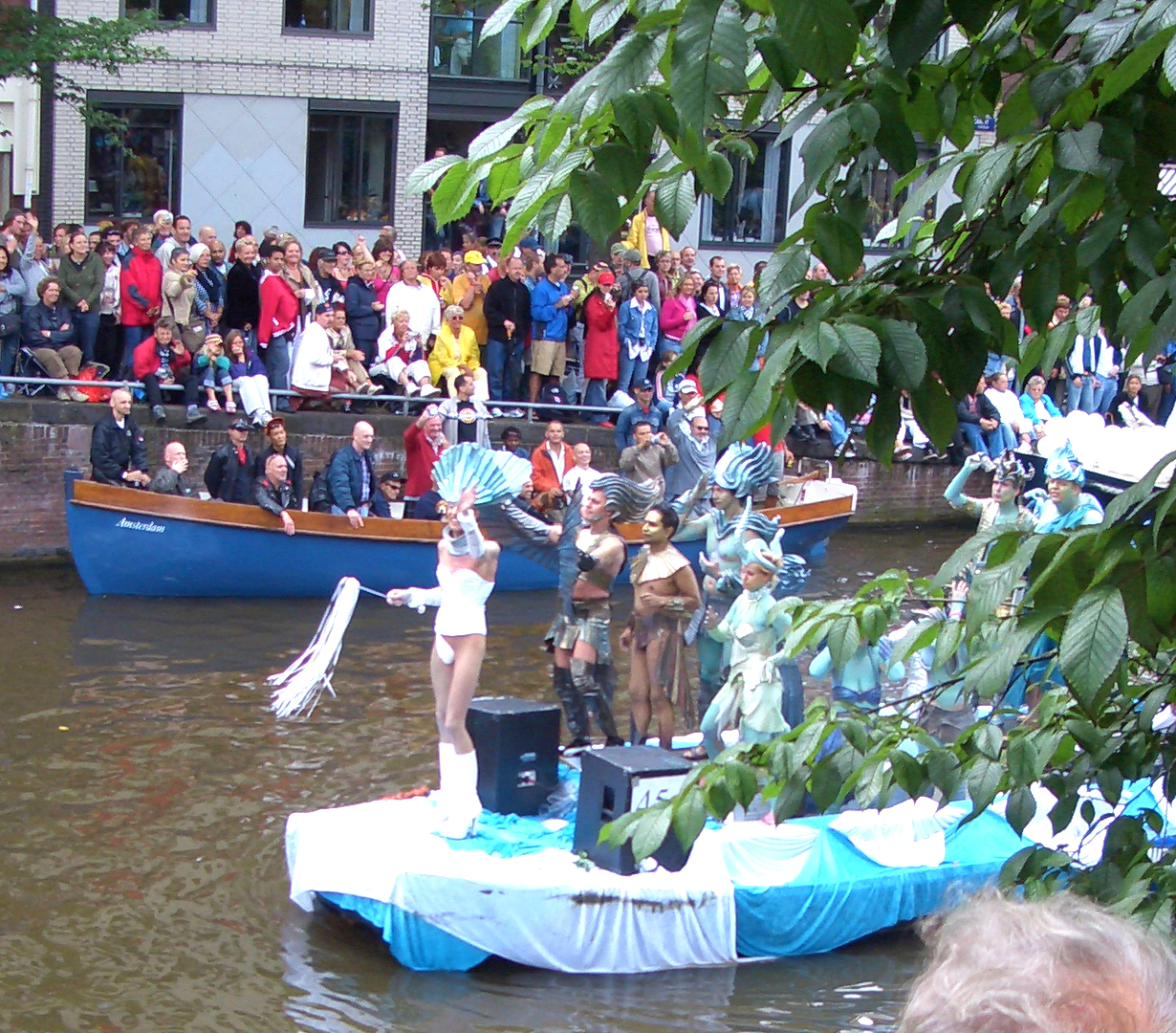
Amsterdam's pride parade is held in its canals

In Amsterdam, a pride parade has been held since 1996. The week(end)-long event involves concerts, sports tournaments, street parties and most importantly the Canal Pride, a parade on boats on the canals of Amsterdam. In 2008 three government ministers joined on their own boat, representing the whole cabinet. Mayor of Amsterdam Job Cohen also joined. About 500,000 visitors were reported. 2008 was also the first year large Dutch international corporations ING Group and TNT NV sponsored the event.

The Utrecht Canal Pride is the second-largest gay pride in the country, organised annually since 2017. Smaller Pride parades are organised in many larger cities across the country.

==== Norway ====
The first pride demonstration in Norway was in 1974, with around 250 participants. The first pride parade was in 1982. During the 1990s, the event developed into a 10 day long festival, including seminars, debates, concerts and parties at different places in Oslo. The 2019 festival involved a total of around 450,000 participants and spectators. The 2025 parade had between 90,000 and 100,000 participants, including the Norwegian Prime Minister Jonas Gahr Støre.

Oslo has been host for the international Europride twice, in 2005 and 2014.

==== Poland ====
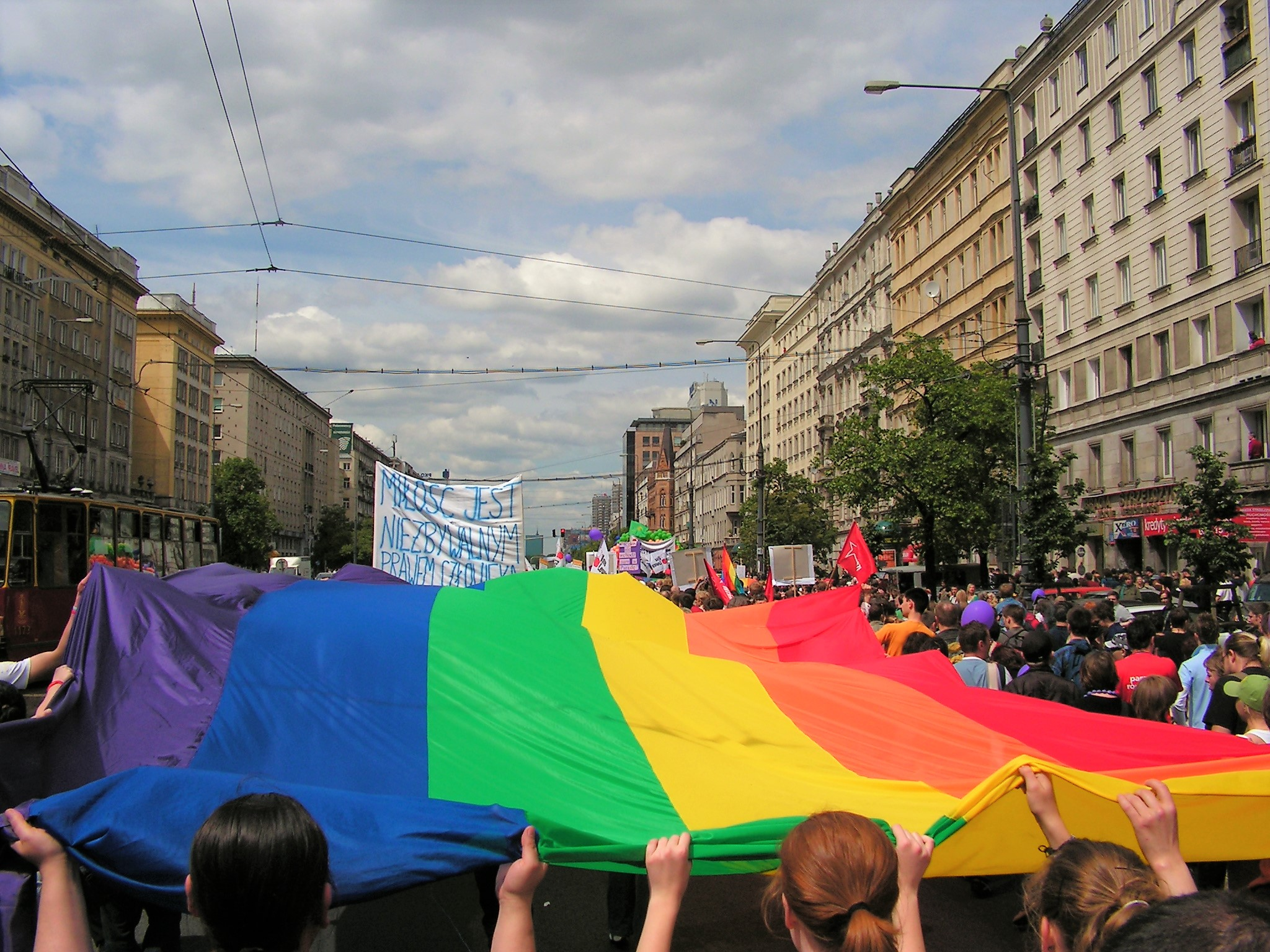
Warsaw Pride in 2006

The oldest pride parade in Poland, the Equality Parade in Warsaw, has been organized since 2001. In 2005, the parade was forbidden by local authorities (including then-Mayor Lech Kaczyński) but occurred nevertheless. The ban was later declared a violation of the European Convention on Human Rights (Bączkowski and Others v. Poland). In 2008, more than 1,800 people joined the march. In 2010 EuroPride took place in Warsaw with approximately 8,000 participants. The last parade in Warsaw, in 2019, drew 80,000 people. Other Polish cities which host pride parades are Kraków, Łódź, Poznań, Gdańsk, Toruń, Wrocław, Lublin, Częstochowa, Rzeszów, Opole, Zielona Góra, Konin, Bydgoszcz, Szczecin, Kalisz, Koszalin, Olsztyn, Kielce, Gniezno, Katowice, Białystok, Radomsko, and Płock.

==== Portugal ====
In Lisbon, the Pride Parade, known as Marcha do Orgulho LGBTI+, has been held every year since 2000, as well as in Porto since 2006. Other locations, such as Funchal, Braga and Ovar have hosted their Pride Parades.

==== Russia ====
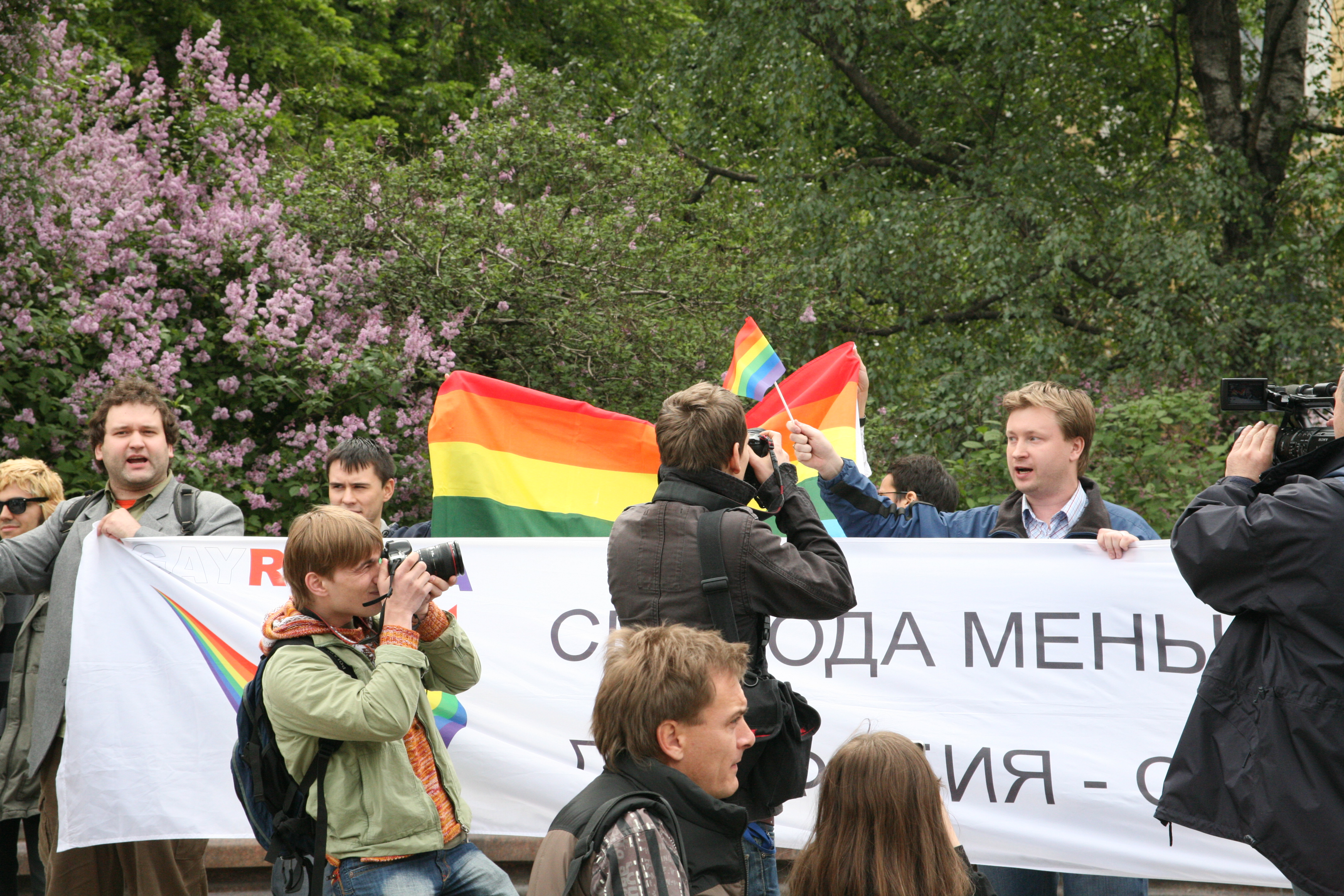
Moscow Pride protest in 2008

Prides in Russia are generally banned by city authorities in St. Petersburg and Moscow, due to opposition from politicians and religious leaders. Moscow Mayor Yuri Luzhkov has described the proposed Moscow Pride as "satanic". Attempted parades have led to clashes between protesters and counter-protesters, with the police acting to keep the two apart and disperse participants. In 2007 British activist Peter Tatchell was physically assaulted. This was not the case in the high-profile attempted march in May 2009, during the Eurovision Song Contest. In this instance the police played an active role in arresting pride marchers. The European Court of Human Rights has ruled that Russia has until January 20, 2010, to respond to cases of pride parades being banned in 2006, 2007 and 2008.

In June 2012, Moscow courts enacted a hundred-year ban on pride parades.

==== Serbia ====
===== Belgrade Pride =====
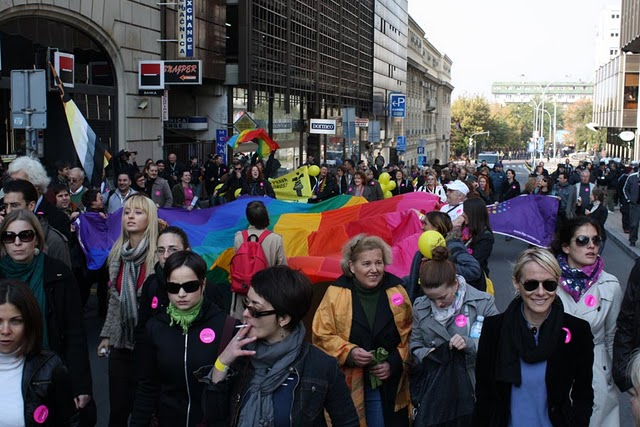
Belgrade Pride parade in Belgrade in 2010

Belgrade Pride is an annual LGBTQ+ pride parade and festival held in Belgrade, Serbia. It is the most prominent LGBTQ+ event in Serbia and has a history marked by both struggle and progress.

The first attempt to hold a Belgrade Pride march in 2001 was met with violence from opponents, and subsequent attempts faced government bans and clashes with extremists. In 2014, a turning point was reached when the first major, peaceful Pride march took place with significant police protection.

Since 2014, Belgrade Pride has become a more regular and peaceful event, with growing participation. In 2023, Belgrade Pride saw its largest ever turnout, marking a significant step forward for LGBTQ+ rights in Serbia.

In 2022, Belgrade hosted EuroPride. The Government of Serbia banned the Pride march due to the potential risk for its participants shown by protests by extremist ultra-right-wing organizations. Despite the ban, the EuroPride march happened and approximately 10 000 people walked the shortened march route. Minor incidents happened during the parade walk, orchestrated by opponents of Europride.

==== Slovenia ====
Although first LGBTQ festival in Slovenia dates to 1984, namely the Ljubljana Gay and Lesbian Film Festival, the first pride parade was only organized in 2001 after a gay couple was asked to leave a Ljubljana café for being homosexual. Ljubljana pride is traditionally supported by the mayor of Ljubljana and left-wing politicians.

On June 30, 2019, Maribor held their first pride parade which was largely supported by several embassy ambassadors and other organizations.

==== Spain ====
Spain's first pride parade was held in Barcelona on 26 June 1977, but was violently repressed by police, as official attitudes towards the LGBT community had not yet changed much since Franco's death in 1975. However, Orgull de Barcelona ("Barcelona Pride") is nowadays a yearly event, and local politicians attend. The 2022 gathering drew a crowd of some 90,000.

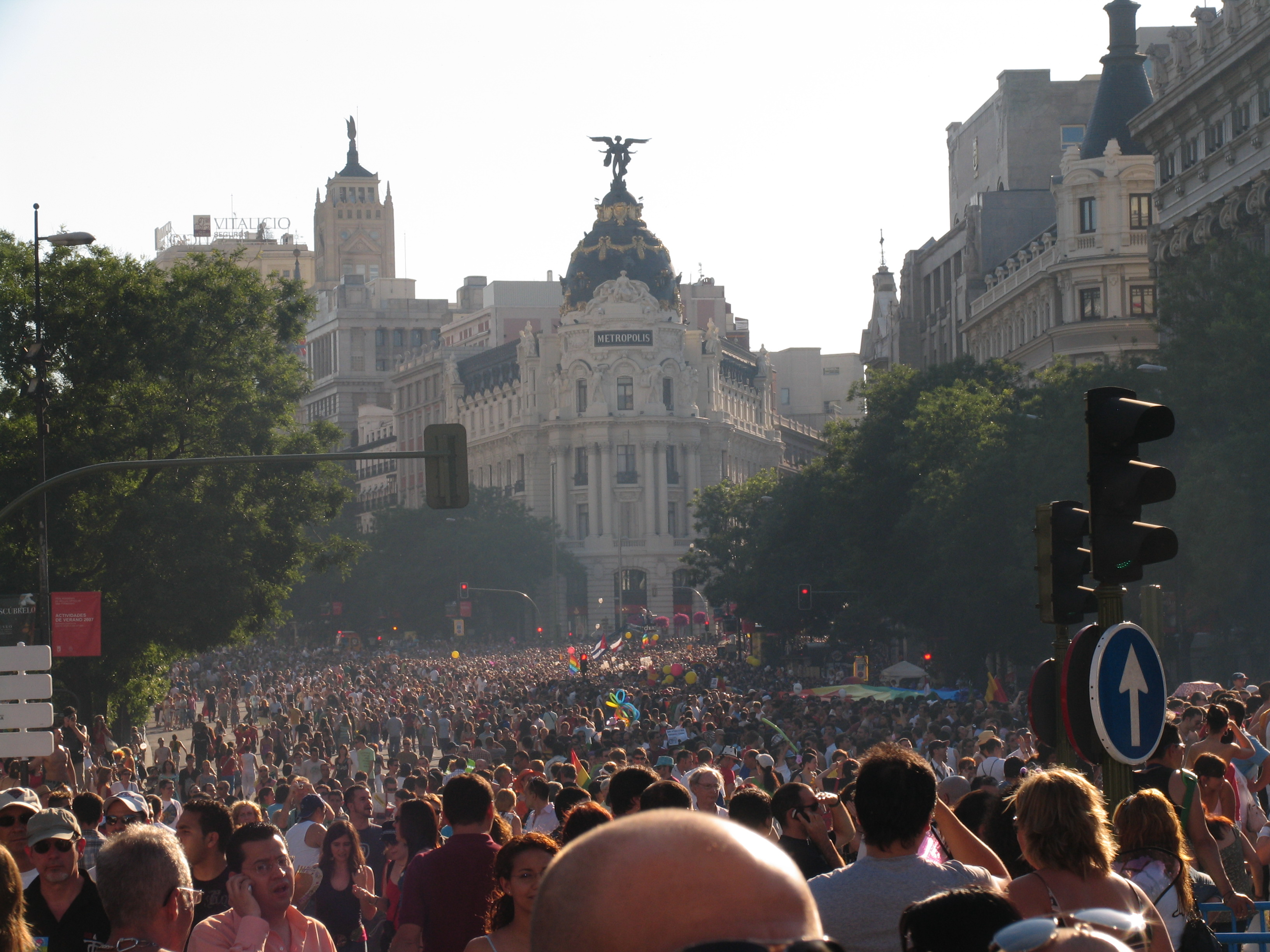
More than 500,000 people attended the Europride 2007 pride parade in Madrid

Madrid Pride Parade, known as Fiesta del Orgullo Gay (or simply Fiesta del Orgullo), Manifestación Estatal del Orgullo LGTB and Día del Orgullo Gay (or simply Día del Orgullo), is held the first Saturday after June 28 since 1979.

The event is organised by COGAM (Madrid GLTB Collective) and FELGTBI+ (Spanish Federation of Lesbians, Gays, Trans, Bisexuals, Intersex, and more) and supported by other national and international LGTB groups. The first Gay Pride Parade in Madrid was held in June 1979 nearly four years after the death of Spain's dictator Francisco Franco, with the gradual arrival of democracy and the de-criminalization of homosexuality. Since then, dozens of companies like Microsoft, Google and Schweppes and several political parties and trade unions, including Spanish Socialist Workers' Party, PODEMOS, United Left, Union, Progress and Democracy, CCOO and UGT have been sponsoring and supporting the parade. Madrid Pride Parade is the biggest gay demonstration in Europe, with more than 1.5 million attendees in 2009, according to the Spanish government.

In 2007, Europride, the European Pride Parade, took place in Madrid. About 2.5 million people attended more than 300 events over one week in the Spanish capital to celebrate Spain as the country with the most developed LGBT rights in the world. Independent media estimated that more than 200,000 visitors came from foreign countries to join in the festivities. Madrid gay district Chueca, the biggest gay district in Europe, was the centre of the celebrations. The event was supported by the city, regional and national government and private sector which also ensured that the event was financially successful. Barcelona, Valencia and Seville hold also local Pride Parades. In 2008 Barcelona hosted the EuroGames.

In 2014, Winter Pride Maspalomas was held for the first time at Maspalomas, Gran Canaria, Canary Islands, one of one Europe's most popular LGTB tourist destinations. Within a few years of its existence, Winter Pride Maspalomas became a major Pride celebration within Spain and Europe. During its 6th edition in November 2019, the Pride Walk LGBT equal rights march had over 18,000 international visitors.

In 2017, Madrid hosted the WorldPride. It would be the first time WorldPride was celebrated in a Spanish city.

==== Sweden ====
The Stockholm Pride, sometimes styled as STHLM Pride, is the biggest annual Pride event in the Nordic countries with over 60,000 participants early and 600,000 people following the parade. The Stockholm Pride is notable for several officials such as the Swedish Police Authority and Swedish Armed Forces having their own entities in the parade.

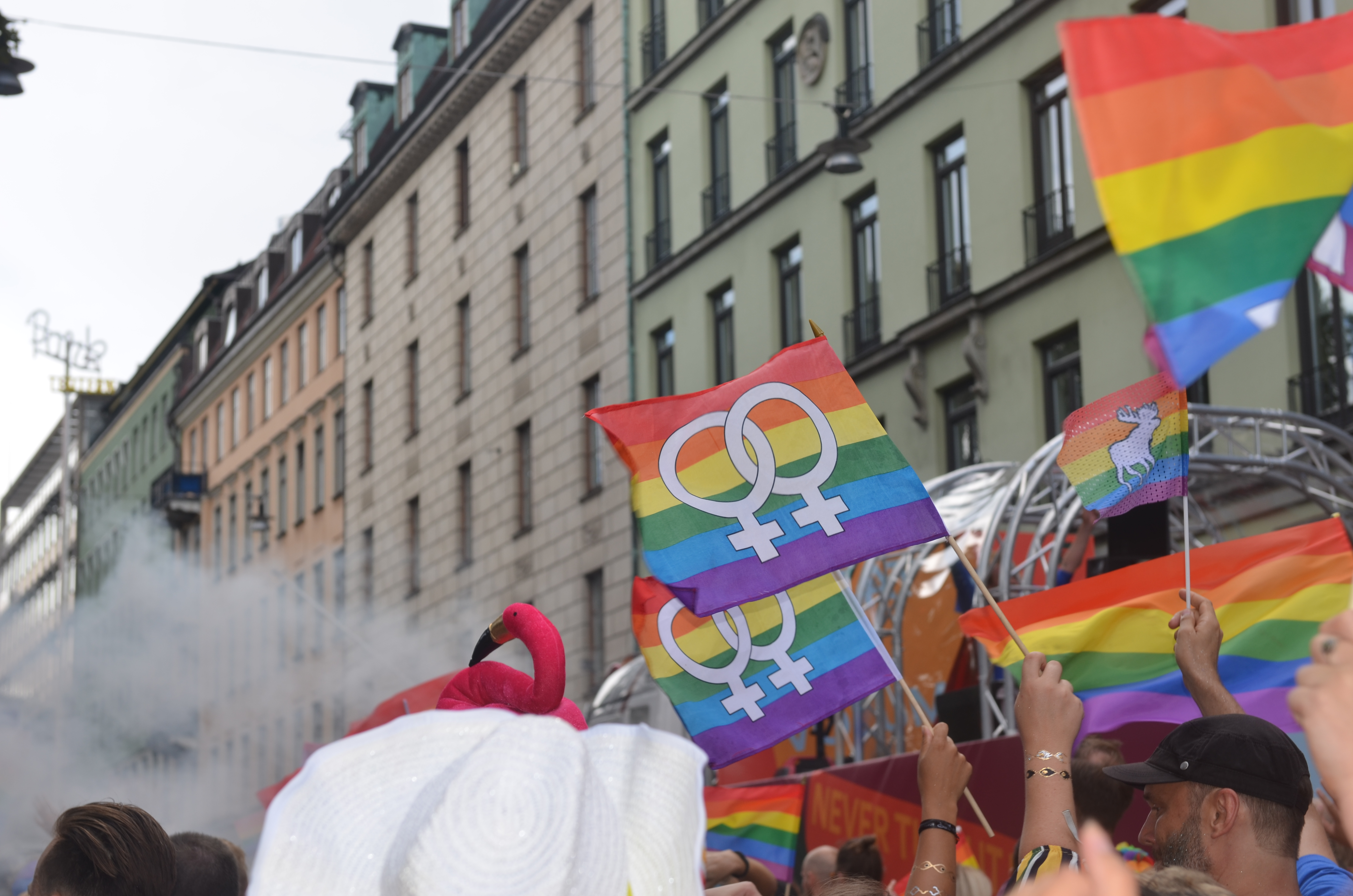
EuroPride parade in Stockholm, Sweden, 2018

Several Swedish cities have their own Pride festivals, most notably Gothenburg and Malmö. In 2018, Stockholm Pride and Gothenburg West Pride, co-hosted the 25th annual EuroPride parade.

==== Turkey ====
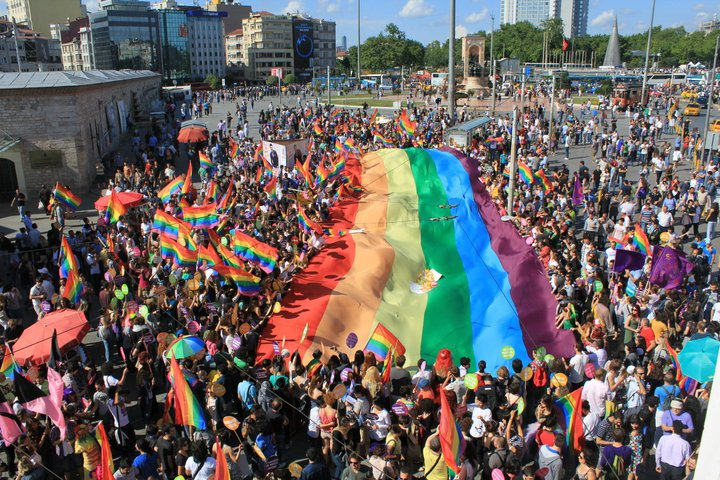
Istanbul LGBT pride parade in 2011, Taksim Square, Istanbul

Turkey was the first Muslim-majority country in which a gay pride march was held. Gay pride march in Istanbul started with 30 people in 2003. Similar pride marches were being held each year in other cities including Ankara (since 2008), İzmir and Antalya (since 2013). In Istanbul, the numbers have increased each year, reaching roughly 15,000 people by 2011. The 2014 pride attracted more than 100,000 people, therefore making Gay Pride Istanbul the biggest march of its kind in the Muslim World. The European Union praised Turkey that the parade went ahead without disruption. Politicians of the biggest opposition party, CHP and another opposition party, BDP also lent their support to the demonstration.

The pride march in Istanbul does not receive any support of the municipality or the government. For more than a decade, the march along with similar parades in Ankara, Izmir, Antalya, Mersin and others proceeded without major incidents or violence. This stood in sharp contrast to the violent disruptions and bloody confrontations in countries like Bulgaria, Croatia, Serbia, Slovakia, Ukraine, and Russia. However, since 2015, the Turkish government has banned the parades, using tear gas and water cannons to disperse the crowds. In 2016, the pride march was banned by the Istanbul Governor's Office "for the safety of our citizens, first and foremost the participants'."

In 2019, for the fifth consecutive year the Istanbul Governor's Office yet again banned the LGBTQ Pride Parade, citing security concerns. On 29 June, hundreds of people defied the ban, they were met with tear gas and water cannon from the police. Activists continue to organize Pride events in defiance of the bans.

On 10 June 2018, the 6th İzmir Pride was held. Around 50,000 people participated at the Pride.

==== Northern Cyprus ====
The annual pride parade has been held in North Nicosia without incidents since 2014. In 2024, Mayor Mehmet Harmanci participated.

==== United Kingdom ====
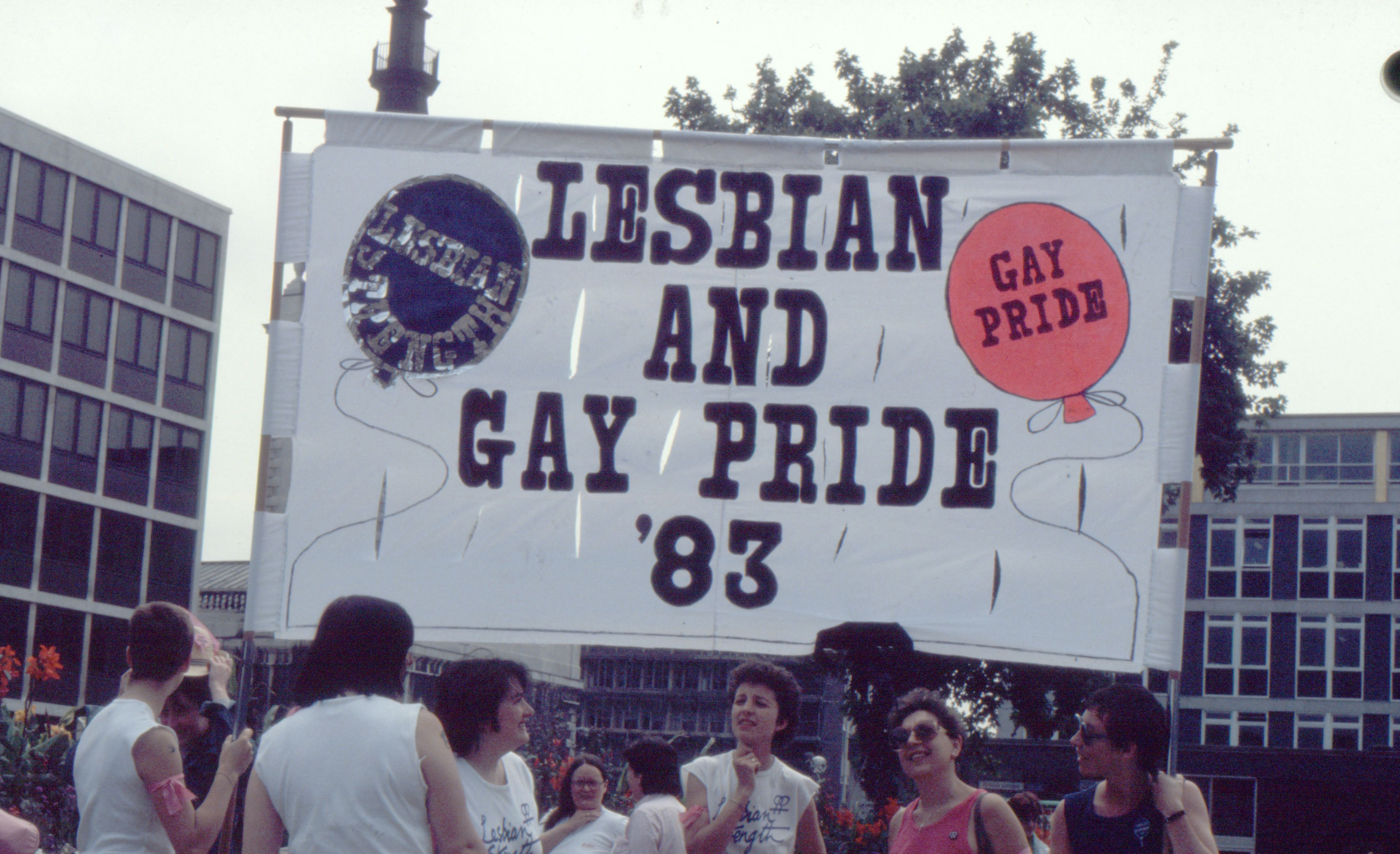
Lesbian Strength March 1983

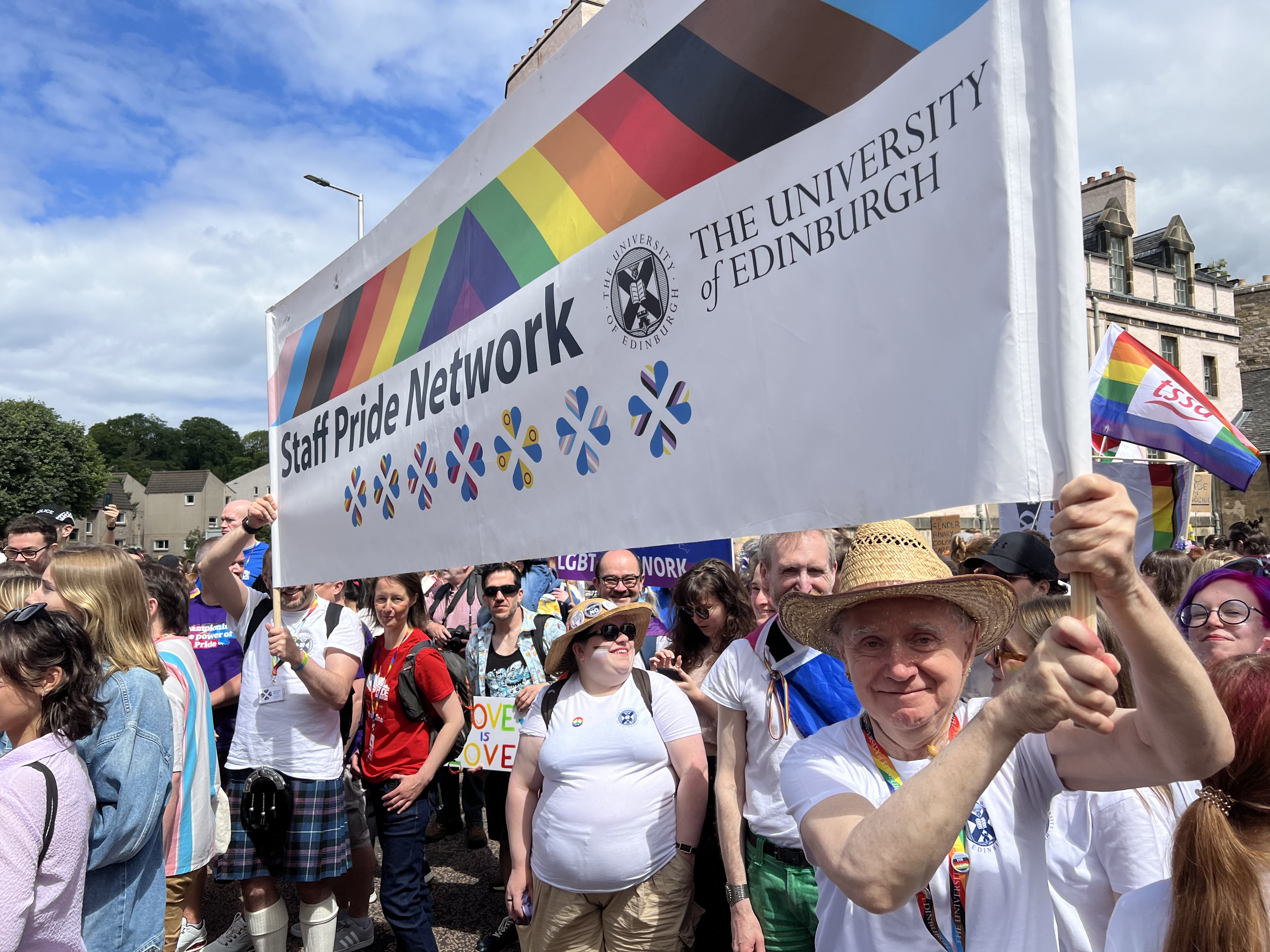
Edinburgh University Staff Pride Network, Pride Edinburgh 2024

There are five main pride events in the UK LGBT pride calendar: London, Brighton, Liverpool, Manchester, and Birmingham being the largest and are the cities with the biggest gay populations.

Pride in London is one of the biggest in Europe and takes place on the final Saturday in June or first Saturday in July each year. London also hosted a Black Pride in August and Soho Pride or a similar event every September. During the early-1980s, there was a women-only Lesbian Strength march held each year a week before the Gay Pride march. 2012 saw World Pride coming to London.

Starting in 2017, there is a Pride parade for the city's black community that takes place the day after the main Pride parade, at the Vauxhall Gardens. In February 2018, the charity Stonewall announced that they would support Black Pride instead of the main Pride parade.

On 5 July 2025, the Pride in London parade was carried out from Hyde Park Corner to its destination in Whitehall.

Brighton Pride is held on the first Saturday of August (apart from in 2012 when the event was moved to September due to the 2012 Olympics). The event starts from the seafront and culminating at Preston Park.

Liverpool Pride was launched in 2010, but by 2011 it became the largest free Gay Pride festival in the United Kingdom outside London. (Liverpool's LGBTQ population was 94,000 by mid-2009 according to the North West Regional Development Agency.

Manchester Pride has been running since 1985 and centres around the famous Canal Street. It is traditionally a four-day celebration held over the August bank holiday weekend.

Birmingham Pride usually takes place during the final Spring bank holiday weekend in May, and focuses on the Birmingham Gay Village area of the city, with upwards of 70,000 people in attendance annually.

Pride events also happen in most other major cities such as Pride Cymru in Cardiff and events in Belfast, Bristol, Edinburgh, Glasgow, Hull, Leeds, Leicester, Newcastle, Nottingham and Sheffield.

In 2025 the Christian Institute was planning a judicial review of civil service staff participation in Pride events.

=== North America ===
==== Barbados ====
The island nation held its first pride parade in July 2018. It attracted a diverse group, which included members of the lesbian, gay, bisexual and transgender (LGBT) community, allies of the community, tourists and at least one member of the local clergy who came out strongly in support of the LGBT movement.

==== Canada ====
===== Montreal =====
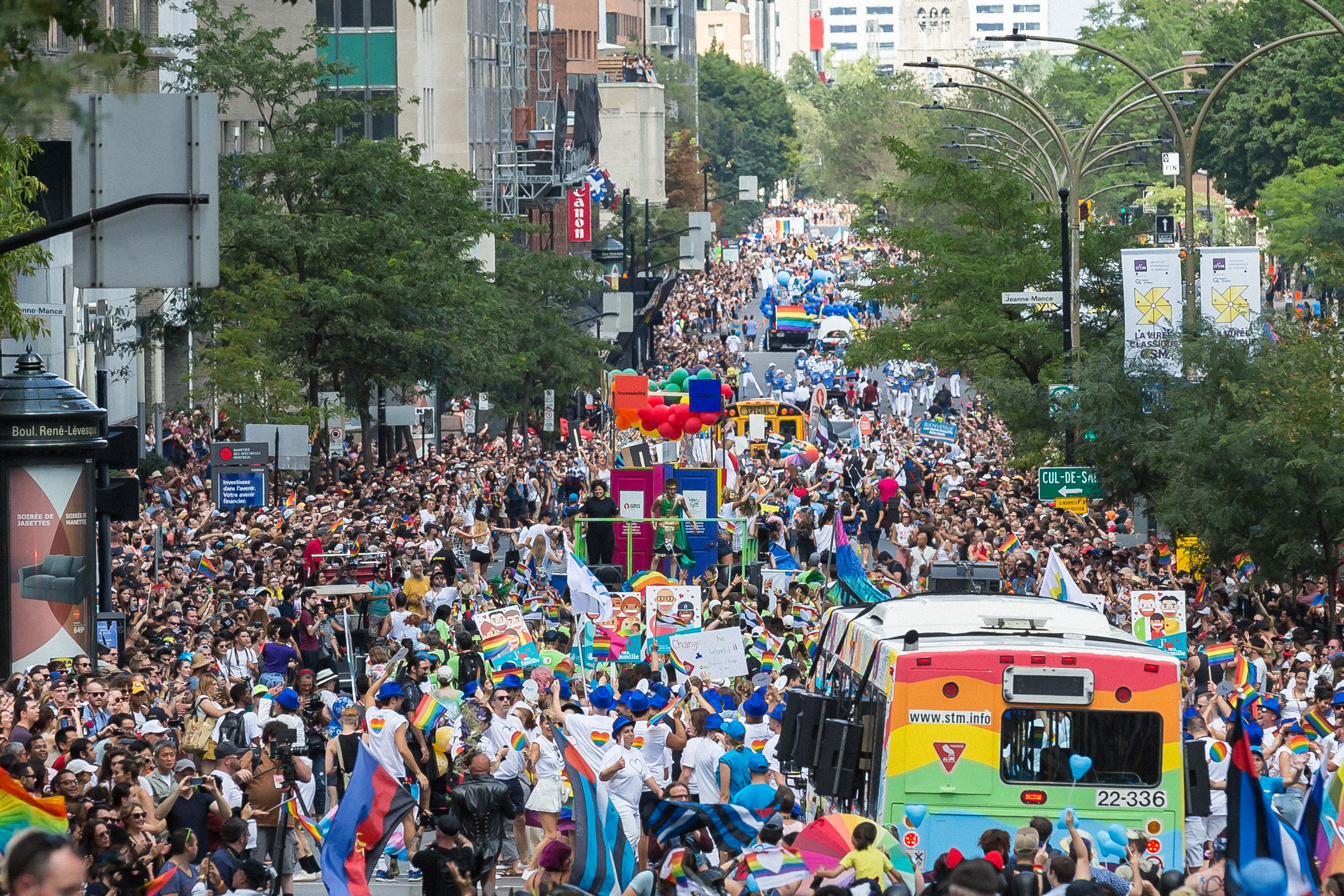
Montreal Pride Parade in 2018.

Montreal Pride Parade, is held in mid-August and has taken place every year since 1979, when a group of 200 people commemorated New York City's 1969 Stonewall Riots with "Gairilla", a precursor to Montreal's gay pride parade celebrations. The LGBTQ+ festivities take place over eleven days, with events centered around the Gay Village.

In May 2023, Montreal Pride launched a comprehensive rebrand of its website and logo, meant to signal that the non-profit had moved on from the last-minute cancellation of the 2022 parade, which was cancelled due to a lack of organization.

Montreal Pride has hired 200 additional employees with event planning experience to ensure the August 13, 2023 parade is well-organized and prepared for the 100,000 expected attendees.

===== Ottawa =====
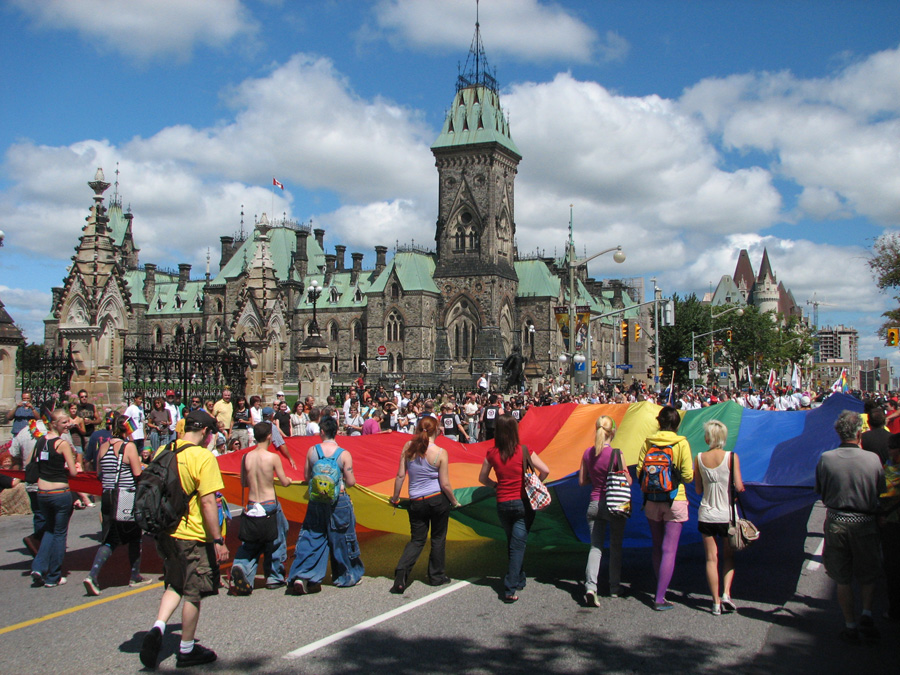
Parade marchers passing the Canadian Parliament Buildings during the Ottawa Capital Pride parade on August 26, 2007.

Ottawa Pride Parade, inaugurated in 1989, is an annual LGBT pride event spanning Canada's capital city of Ottawa, Ontario, and its neighbour Gatineau, Quebec. Over the years, this event has significantly grown and is now a prominent fixture held on the fourth Sunday of August.

Ottawa's inaugural Pride Parade took place on Sunday, June 18, 1989, initially occurring annually in June until 1994 when it was rescheduled to July. In 2005, the Pride Festival moved from Bank Street back to Festival Plaza due to the high costs and outstanding debts of the Pride Committee. Consequently, the festival's dates were shifted from July to August, aligning with constraints at Festival Plaza. This scheduling adjustment is the reason why Ottawa's Pride Parade is held on the fourth Sunday of August each year.

===== Toronto =====
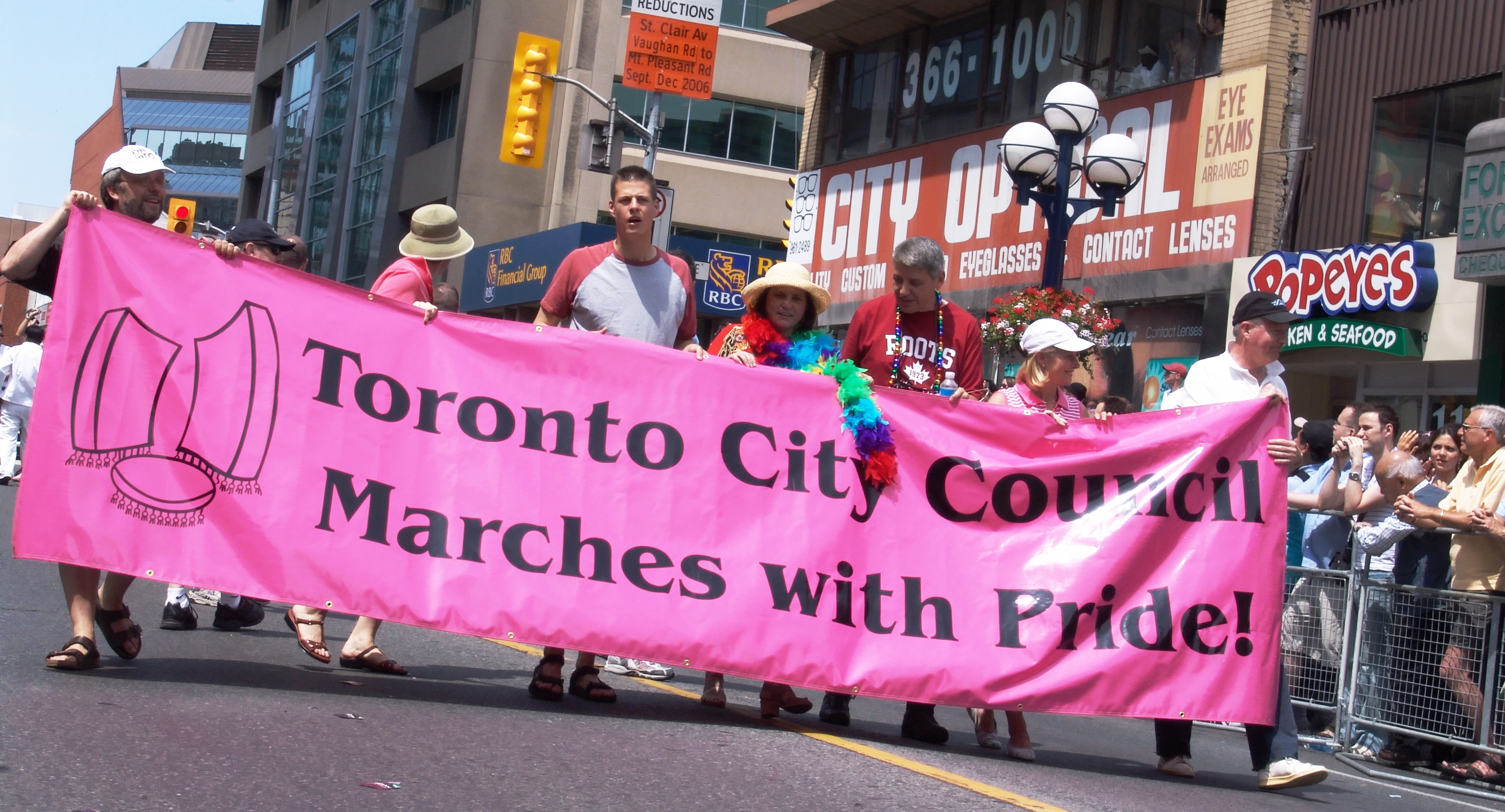
Toronto: Several City Councillors taking part in the 2006 Pride Parade.

Toronto's pride parade has been held yearly or every June since 1981; the first pride parade in Toronto was held in June 1981. In 2003, its activists helped score a major victory when the Ontario Court of Appeals upheld a lower court ruling which made same-sex marriage legal in Ontario, the first jurisdiction in North America to do so. By this time the Toronto Pride Week Festival had been running for twenty-three years. It is also one of the largest, attracting around 1.3 million people in 2009. The 38th pride parade in Toronto was held on June 24, 2018. Toronto hosted WorldPride in 2014.

===== Vancouver =====
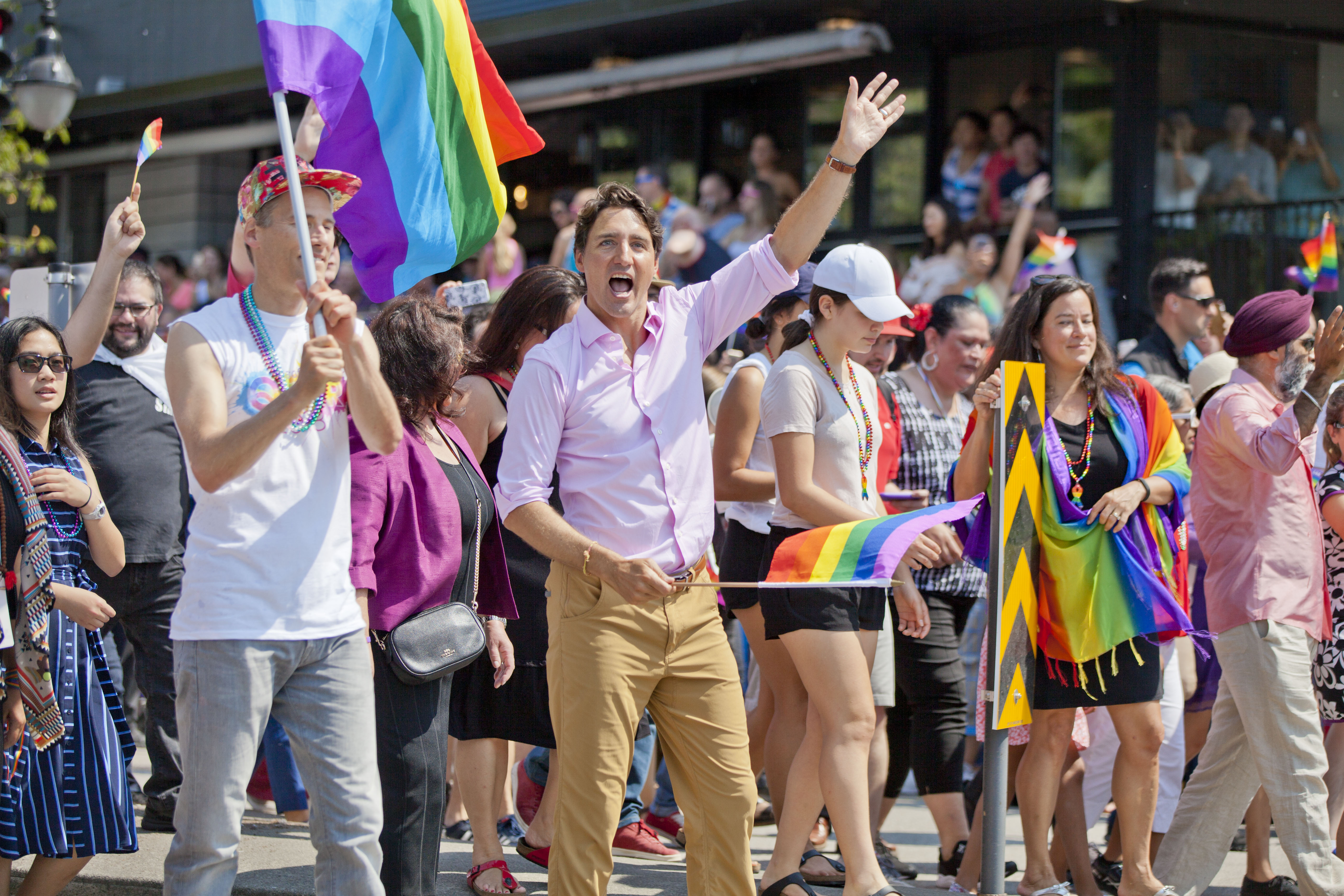
Canadian Prime Minister Justin Trudeau and Vancouver Mayor Gregor Robertson at the 2018 Pride Parade.

Vancouver's Pride Parade takes place each year during the August long weekend (BC Day falls on the first Monday of August in the province of British Columbia). The parade takes place in the downtown core with over 150 floats moving along Robson Street, Denman Street and along Davie Street. The parade has a crowd of over 150,000 attendees with well over half a million in attendance for the August 4, 2013 Pride Parade. New for 2013 are the permanently painted rainbow crosswalks in Vancouver's West End neighbourhood at Davie and Bute streets. The city of Surrey, in the Metro Vancouver area also hosts a Pride Festival, though on a much smaller scale.

===== Winnipeg =====
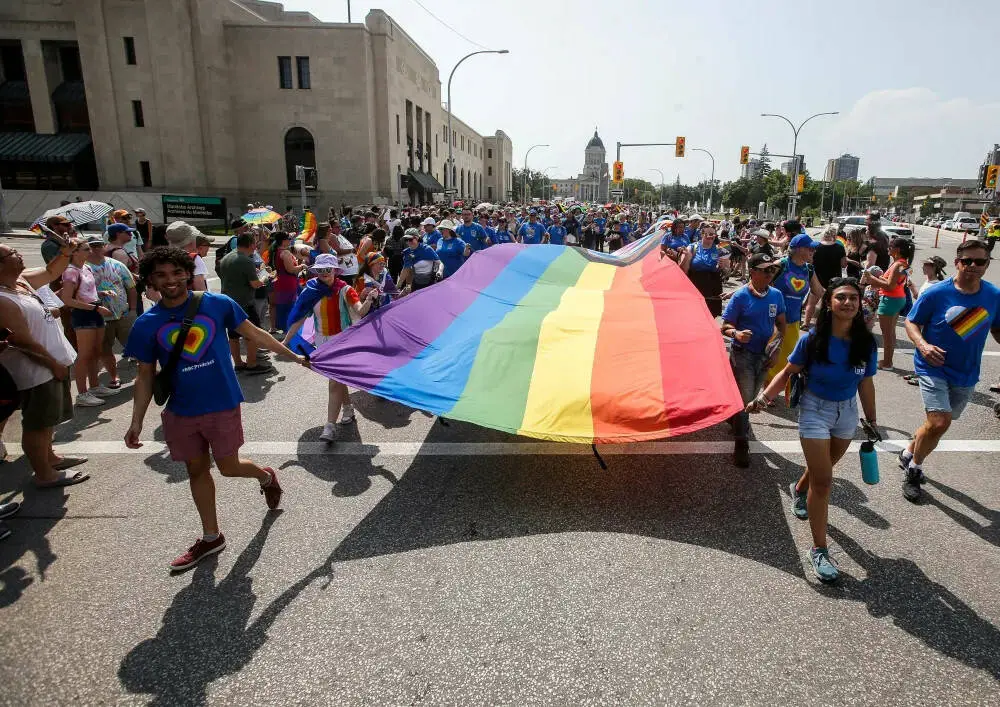
'Walk Loud, Walk Proud' - Capturing the vibrant spirit of Winnipeg's Pride Parade on June 4, 2023.

Winnipeg's Pride Parade takes place annually over the course of several days and is one of the largest Pride events in central Canada with 10 days of community based events and activities. Winnipeg's first Pride event came about after the government voted in favour of including the provision of sexual orientation, under the prescribed provincial human rights code in 1987. The parade started as a march of celebration led by activists and supporters who gathered outside Manitoba's Legislative Assembly awaiting the announcement of the governments decision, when it was released, activists numbered around 250, including notable figures such as Albert McLeod and Connie Merasty who were active parts of community organizations advocating for human rights recognition.

On June 4, 2023, Winnipeg's Pride president Barry Karlenzig revealed that a record-breaking 10,000 people had registered to march. This marked the largest parade in the event's history.

==== Mexico ====
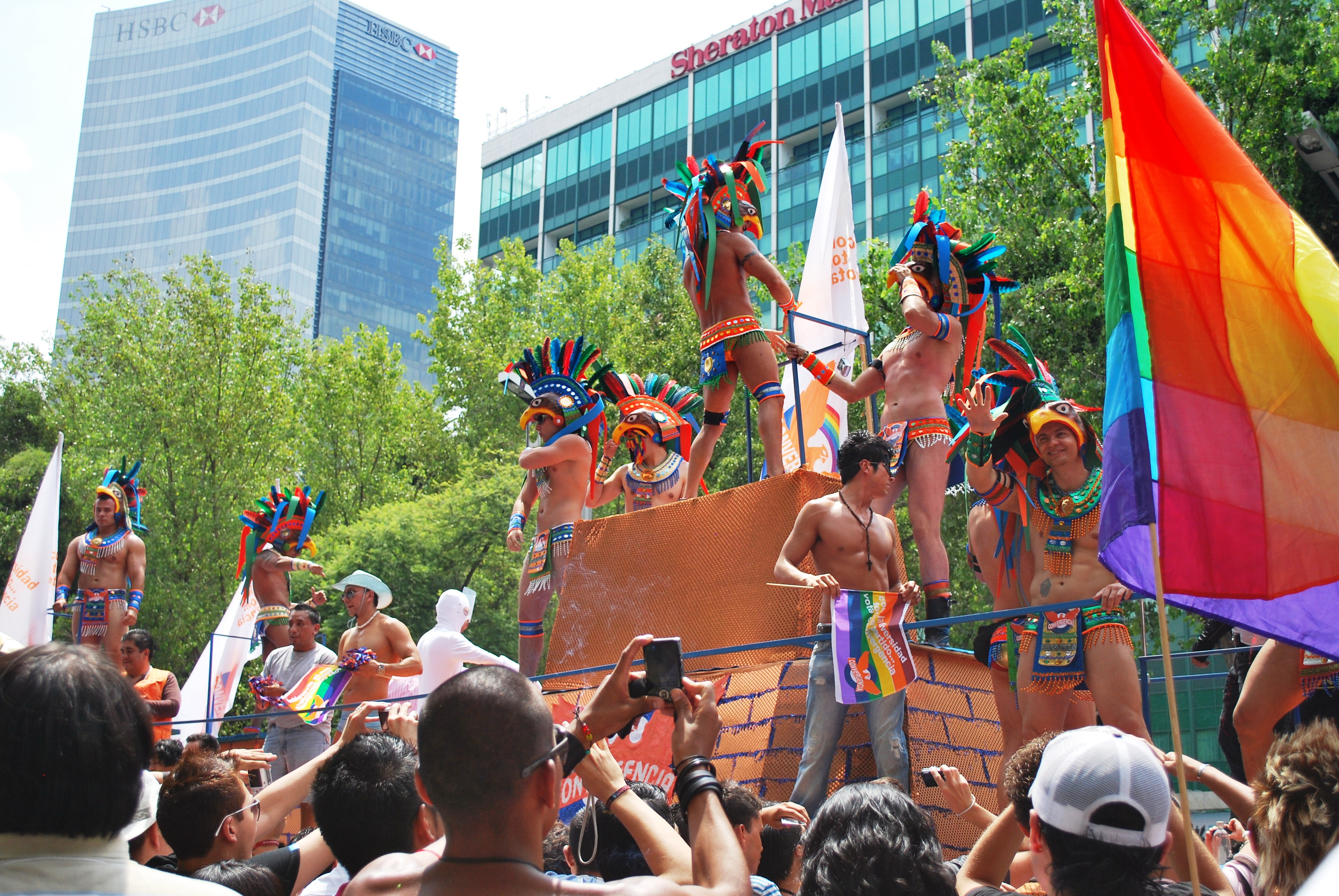
Float with Aztec Eagle Warrior theme at 2009 LGBT Pride Parade in Mexico City

The first gay pride parade in Mexico occurred in Mexico City in 1979, and it was attended by over a thousand people. Ever since, it has been held annually under different slogans, with the purpose of bringing visibility to sexual minorities, raising awareness about HIV/AIDS, fighting homophobia, and advocating for LGBT rights, including the legalization of civil unions, same-sex marriages, and LGBTQ adoption. In 2009, more than 350,000 people attended the gay pride march in Mexico City—100,000 more than the previous year. Guadalajara has also held their own Guadalajara Gay Pride every June since 1996, and it is the second-largest gay pride parade in the country. Gay pride parades have also spread to the cities of León, Guanajuato, Puebla, Tijuana, Toluca, Cancún, Acapulco, Mérida, Xalapa, Cuernavaca, Chihuahua, Matamoros, Saltillo, Mazatlan, Los Cabos, Puerto Vallarta, and Hermosillo, among others.

==== Trinidad and Tobago ====
Trinidad and Tobago organised its first pride parade on 27 July 2018 at the Nelson Mandela Park in Port of Spain. Expressing his opinion on the march, Roman Catholic Archbishop Rev. Jason Gordon said: "TT is a democracy and as such members of society have a right to protest whenever they believe their rights are not being upheld or violated. (The) LGBT+ community has several areas where there is legitimate concern and these have to be taken seriously by the country and by the government and people of TT. "

==== United States ====
The first pride parade was the Chicago Pride Parade, which has been hosted annually since June 27, 1970. It also is the largest pride parade in Illinois. Pride parades would eventually be greater media visibility and participation in the 1990s, which led to US President Bill Clinton issuing Presidential Proclamation 7203, which declared June 1999 the first national Gay and Lesbian Pride Month. In 2015, the Stonewall Inn was declared a historic landmark by the City of New York, which was then upgraded the next year by US President Barack Obama to a national monument.

===== Rural & small-towns =====
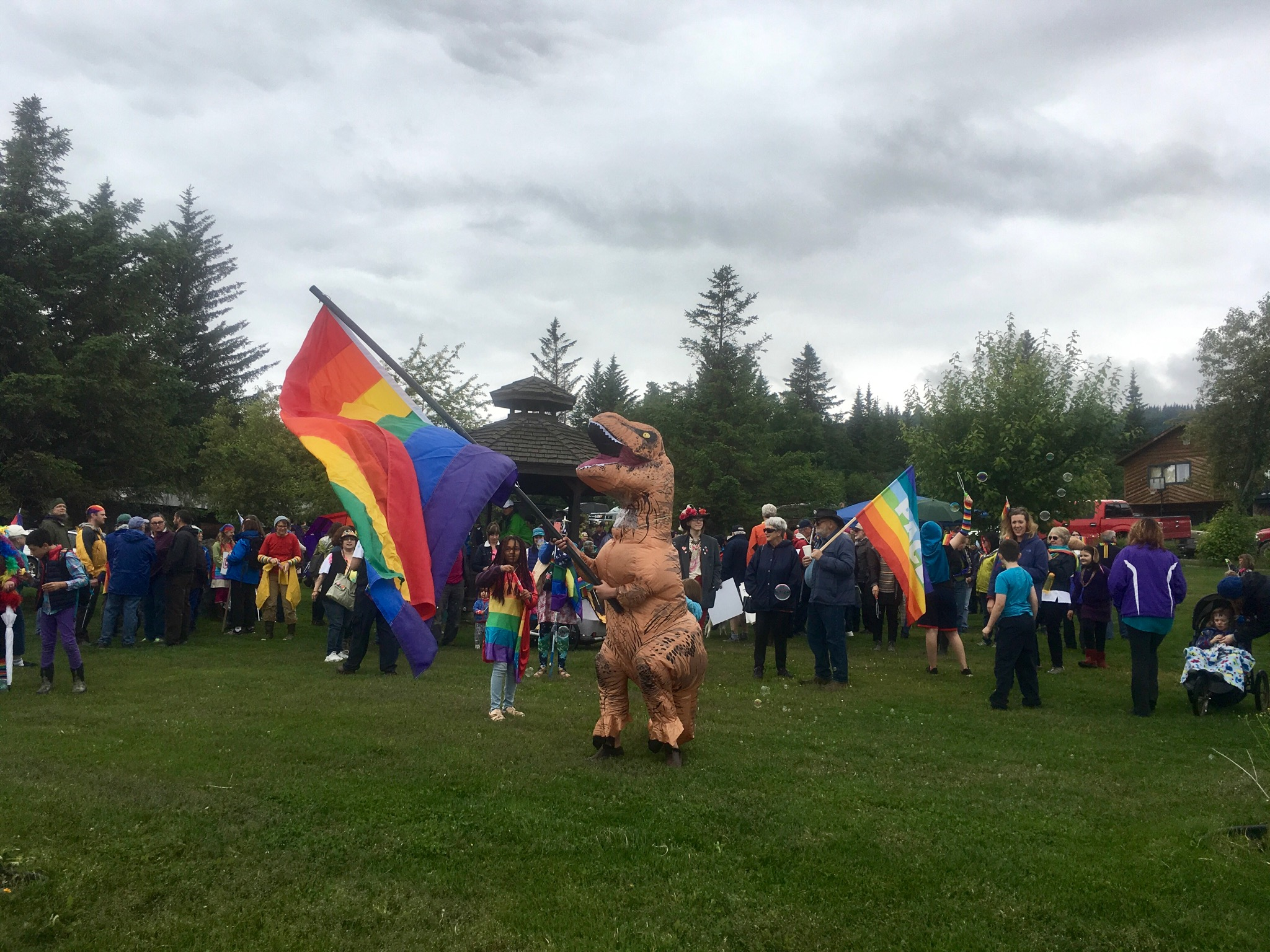
First LGBTQ Pride Parade in Homer, Alaska

Pride festivals, celebrations of LGBTQ+ identity and community, are often associated with major metropolitan areas. However, rural and small-town America has witnessed a flourishing of pride events in recent decades. While the exact number is difficult to pinpoint due to varying levels of promotion, estimates suggest that nearly half of all pride celebrations in the United States take place in towns with fewer than 50,000 residents. These rural pride festivals hold a special significance. They provide a vital space for LGBTQ+ individuals in smaller communities to connect, celebrate their identities, and find acceptance. In areas where isolation and discrimination can be more pronounced, pride festivals offer a sense of belonging and foster important social networks.

Rural Pride festivals often possess a distinct character compared to their urban counterparts. Events tend to be smaller in scale, fostering a closer-knit atmosphere. Local businesses and community organizations are frequently involved, lending the celebrations a personal touch. Events may feature parades, drag performances, barbecues, potlucks, and line dancing.

The Borderland Pride parade is a distinctive rural Pride celebration originally held each year between International Falls, Minnesota, and Fort Frances, Ontario, making it the only Pride march to cross an international border. Participants began the event at Smokey Bear Park in International Falls, proceeded to the Canadian Border Services Agency, and concluded at Rainy Lake Square in Fort Frances with festivities featuring food and entertainment. However, the cross-border parade was discontinued in 2025 due to rising safety and anxiety concerns related to U.S. policies and anti-LGBTQ+ rhetoric under the Trump administration, which made many participants, especially gender-diverse individuals, feel unsafe crossing the border. Since then, the event has taken place entirely within Fort Frances, Canada.

===== New York =====
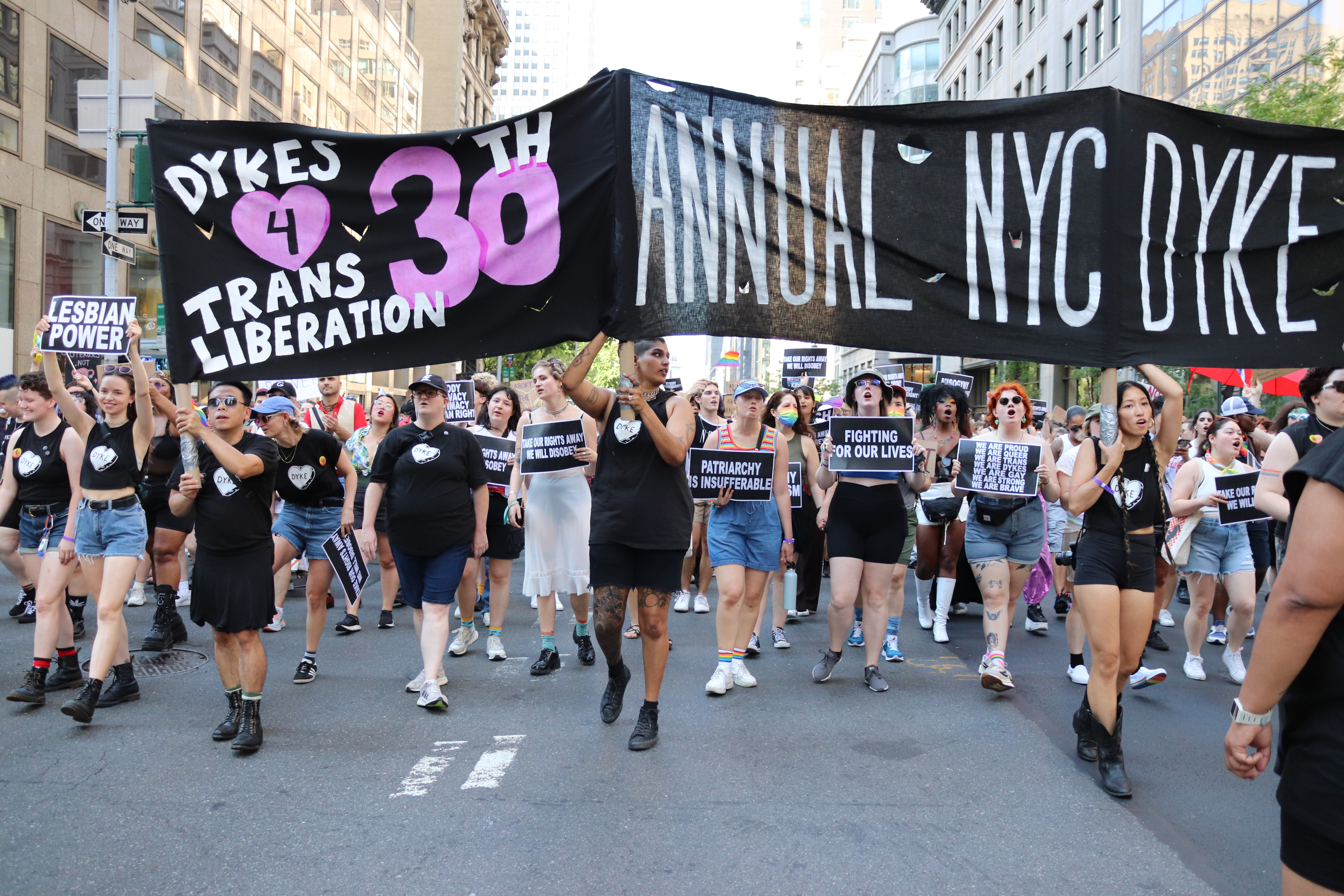
NYC Dyke March, June 25, 2022

The annual New York City Pride March began on June 28, 1970. The New York City Pride March rivals the Sao Paulo Gay Pride Parade as the largest pride parade in the world, attracting tens of thousands of participants and millions of sidewalk spectators each June.

On June 30, 2019, State of New York hosted the largest international LGBTQ pride celebration in history, known as Stonewall 50 – WorldPride NYC 2019, commemorated the 50th anniversary of the Stonewall Riots. The twelve-hour parade included 150,000 pre-registered participants among 695 groups and an estimated five million visitors.

On June 28, 2020, on the 51st anniversary of the Stonewall riots, the Queer Liberation March Protest in New York City clashed with New York Police Department officers. Police alleged that this feud started as a result of a participant vandalizing an NYPD vehicle. Participants claimed tensions began when police attempted to arrest one protester, leading to them beginning to arrest other protestors. Participants also claimed that police pepper sprayed them and used tear gas. GLAAD condemned the police's use of force, comparing it to the actions of police in the original Stonewall riots.

===== Puerto Rico =====
There are two cities in the U.S. territory of Puerto Rico that celebrate pride parades/festivals. The first one began in June 1991 in San Juan; later in 2003, the city of Cabo Rojo started celebrating its own pride parade. The pride parade in Cabo Rojo has become very popular and has received thousands of attendees in the last few years. San Juan Pride runs along Ashford Avenue in the Condado area (a popular tourist district), while Cabo Rojo Pride takes place in Boquerón.

===== Twin Cities (Minneapolis & St. Paul) =====
Twin Cities Pride is a nonprofit organization in Minnesota that holds an annual celebration each June focused on the LGBTQ+ community. The centerpiece is a multi-day festival held in Loring Park, Minneapolis, featuring local LGBTQ+ and BIPOC vendors, food stalls, a beer garden, and entertainment stages. There is also a block party spanning several days. The event draws up to 600,000 attendees

The most prominent event is the Ashley Rukes Pride Parade, named after the late parade organizer and transgender activist. Held on the Sunday of Pride weekend, the parade winds its way down Hennepin Avenue in Minneapolis, drawing crowds of more than 200,000.

=== Oceania ===
==== Australia ====
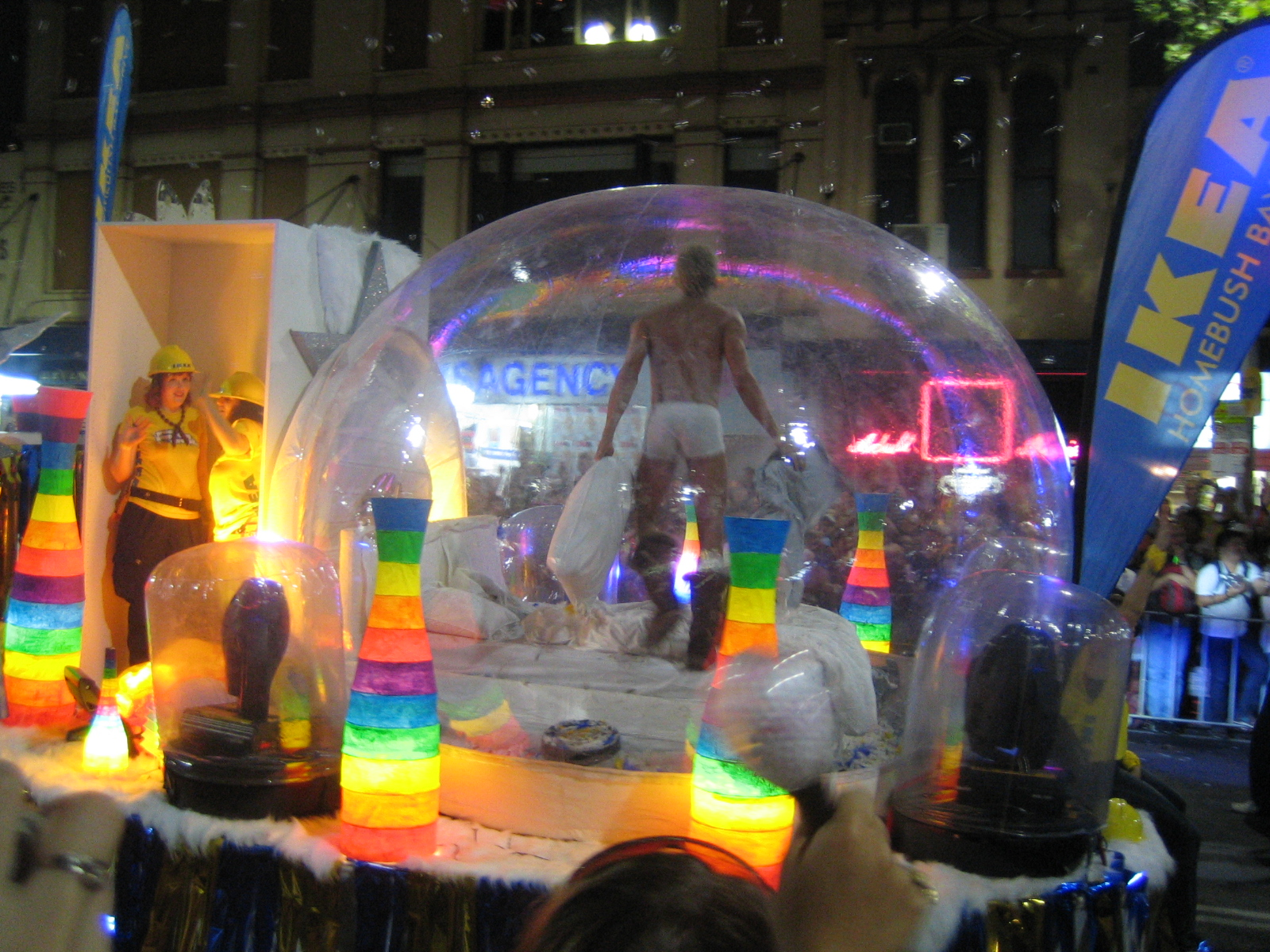
Sydney's pride parade, Sydney Gay & Lesbian Mardi Gras, is one of the world's largest and is held at night

Australia's first pride marches were held during a national Gay Pride Week in September 1973 organised by gay liberation groups in Sydney, Melbourne, Adelaide, and Brisbane.

The Sydney Gay and Lesbian Mardi Gras is the largest Australian pride event and one of the largest in the world. The inaugural event was held on 24 June 1978, and was organised by the Gay Solidarity Group and was intended to be a street festival, one of three events as part of a Day of International Gay Solidarity, produced in response to a call from the organisers of the San Francisco Gay Freedom Day, and highlighting local gay and lesbian rights issues. Following a police riot and assault at the end of the street festival, 53 were arrested; with over 120 more arrested at subsequent protests. The then Sydney Gay Mardi Gras subsequently became an annual event from 1979. The parade is held at night with ≈12,000 participants on and around elaborate floats.

Brisbane's Pride March began in July 1990, and is organised by Brisbane Pride. The March kicks off the Brisbane Pride Festival.

Perth's Pride March was established in October 1990, by the newly formed WA Pride Collective (now WA Pride).

Melbourne's Pride March, now part of the Midsumma Festival (1989–), was established in 1996. The event sees over 5000 participating in the Parade, and 20,000 lining Fitzroy Street, St Kilda.

Adelaide's Pride March was established on an annual basis in 2003, on the anniversary of their first Pride March in 1973. Since then, the Adelaide Pride March has opened the annual Feast Festival.

==== New Zealand ====
Auckland's City Auckland Pride Festival holds its Pride March in February every year. In 2018, Jacinda Ardern became the first sitting New Zealand Prime Minister to walk in the Auckland Pride Parade.

In March, Wellington also holds a pride parade during the Wellington Pride Festival.

At Labour Weekend, October, Paekakariki holds its Pride Festival, A Rainbow in the Village, every year. It holds the unofficial title of having the World's Shortest Pride Parade.

Christchurch holds an annual Pride Festival and parade.

=== South America ===
==== Argentina ====
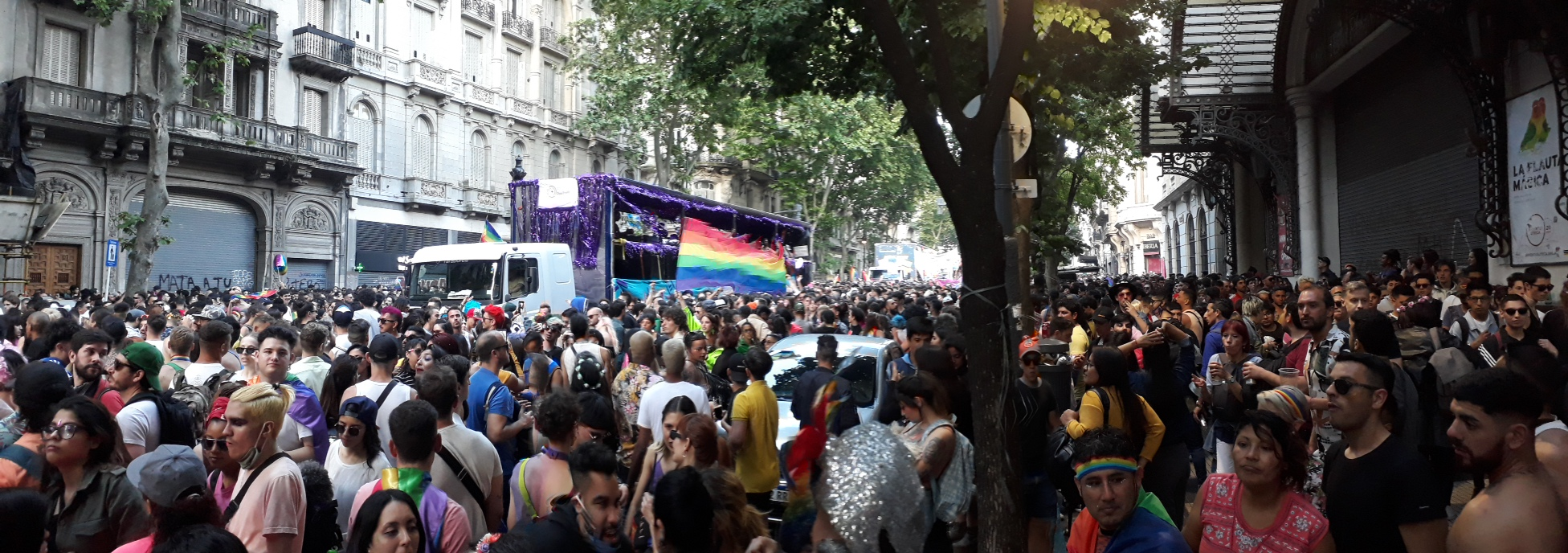
Marcha del Orgullo (March of Pride) LGBTIQ+ Buenos Aires

Buenos Aires has held the March of Pride since 1992. Cordoba has held pride parades since 2008, and Mendoza since 2011. Argentina was one of the first countries in the Western Hemisphere to legalize gay marriage.

==== Brazil ====
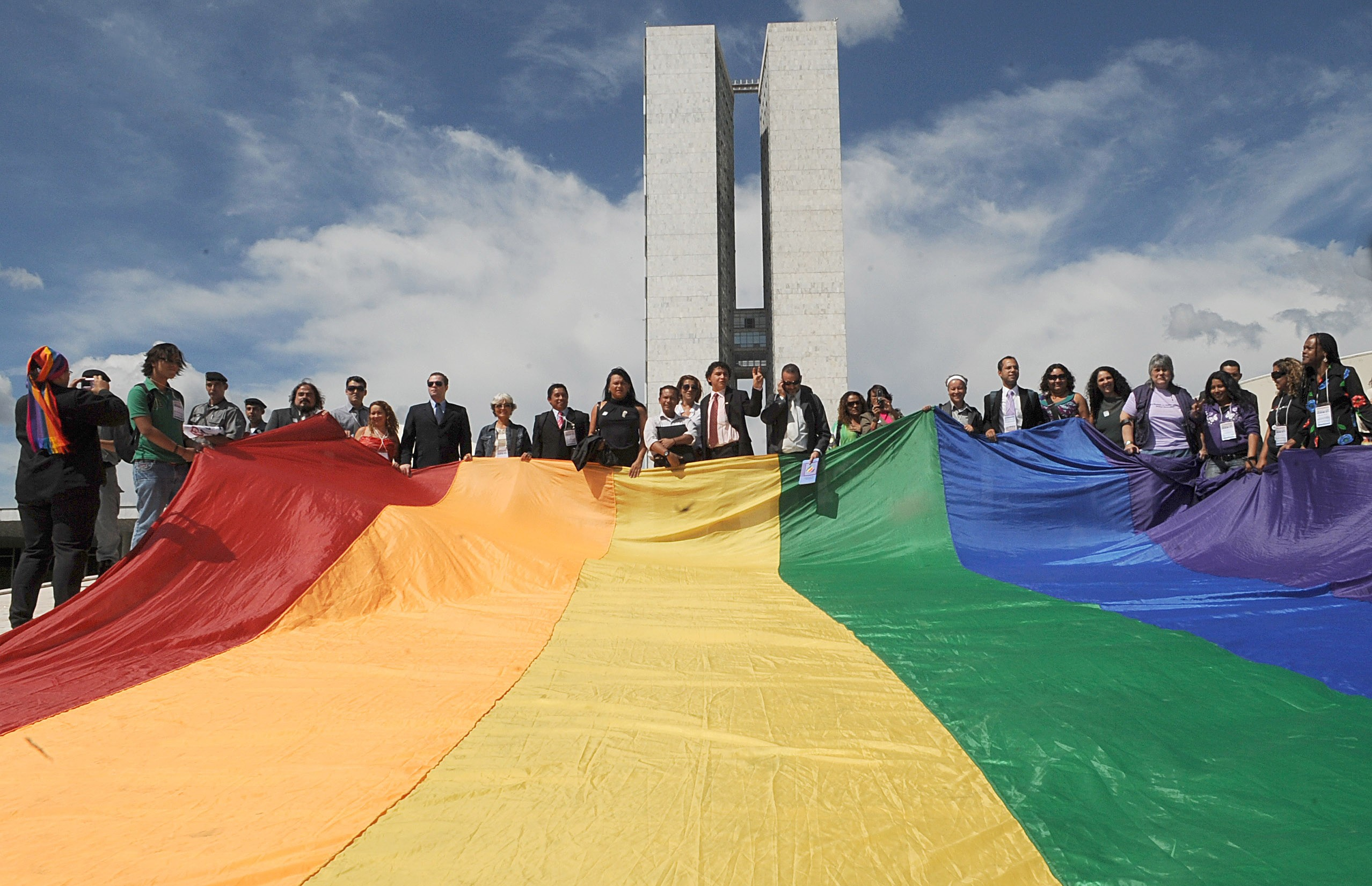
LGBT flag extended in the Parliament of Brazil

The São Paulo Gay Pride Parade happens in Paulista Avenue, in the city of São Paulo, since 1997. The 2006 parade was named the biggest pride parade of the world at the time by Guinness World Records; it typically rivals the New York City Pride March as the largest pride parade in the world. In 2010, the city hall of São Paulo invested R$1 million in the parade.

The Pride Parade is heavily supported by the federal government as well as by the Governor of São Paulo, the event counts with a solid security plan, many politicians show up to open the main event and the government not rarely parades with a float with politicians on top of it. In the Pride the city usually receives about 400,000 tourists and moves between R$180 million and R$190 million.

The Pride and its associated events are organized by the Associação da Parada do Orgulho de Gays, Lésbicas, Bissexuais e Travestis e Transsexuais, since its foundation in 1999. The march is the event's main activity and the one that draws the biggest attention to the press, the Brazilian authorities, and the hundreds of thousands of curious people that line themselves along the parade's route. In 2009, 3.2 million people attended the 13th annual Gay Pride Parade.

The second biggest Pride Parade in Brazil is Rio de Janeiro Gay Pride Parade, numbering about 2 million people, traditionally taking place in Zona Sul or Rio's most affluent neighborhoods between the city center and the world-famous oceanic beaches, which usually happens in the second part of the year, when it is winter or spring in the Southern Hemisphere, generally characterizing milder weather for Rio de Janeiro (about 15°C in difference), except for occasional stormy cold fronts. The Rio de Janeiro Gay Pride Parade and its associated events are organized by the NGO Arco-Íris (Portuguese for rainbow). The group is one of the founders of the Associação Brasileira de Lésbicas, Gays, Bissexuais, Travestis, Transexuais e Intersexos (Brazilian Association of Lesbians, Gays, Bisexuals, Transvestites (this word used as a synonym for transgender persons in Brazil) and Transsexuals and Intersex people). Other Pride Parades which happen in Greater Rio de Janeiro take place in Niterói, Rio de Janeiro's ex-capital in the times when Rio was the Brazilian capital and a separated Federal District, and Nova Iguaçu, where about 800,000 persons live and is located in the center of Baixada Fluminense, which compose all northern suburban cities of Rio de Janeiro metropolitan area numbering 3.5 million people.

Other Southeastern Brazilian parades are held in Cabo Frio (Rio de Janeiro), Campinas (São Paulo), Vitória (capital of Espírito Santo), and Belo Horizonte and Uberaba (Minas Gerais). Southern Brazilian parades take place in Curitiba, Londrina, Florianópolis, Porto Alegre and Pelotas, and Center-Western ones happen in Campo Grande, Cuiabá, Goiânia and Brasília. Across Northeastern Brazil, they are present in all capitals, namely, in Salvador, Aracaju, Maceió, Recife, João Pessoa, Natal, Fortaleza, Teresina and São Luís, and also in Ceará's hinterland major urban center, Juazeiro do Norte. Northern Brazilian parades are those from Belém, Macapá, Boa Vista and Manaus.

==== Chile ====
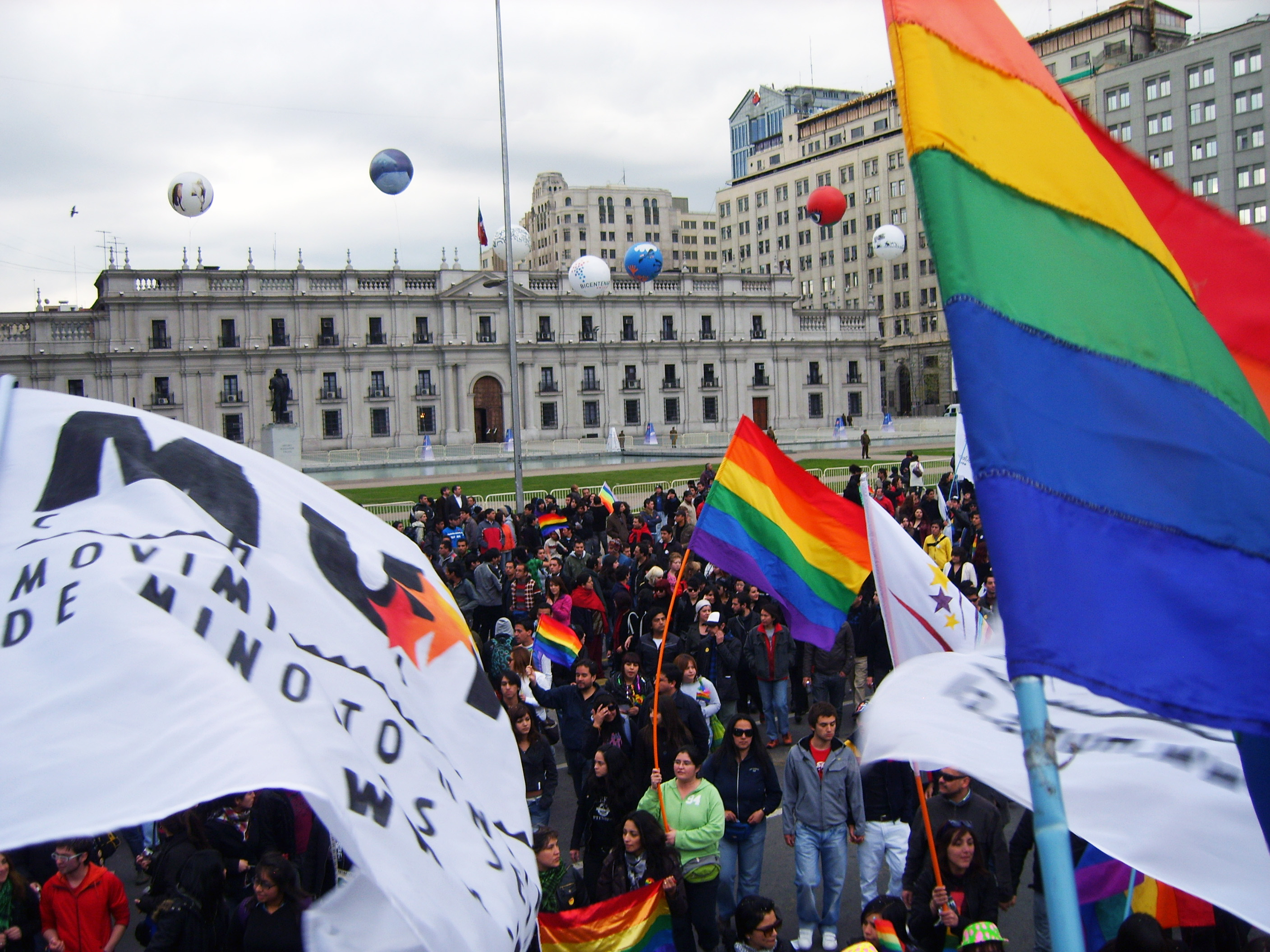
Pride parade in front of Palace of La Moneda, in Santiago in 2009

Since 2006, pride events have been held each year, concentrated mainly in Santiago. In its first version the event gathered over 12,000 people. In the following years, the event has continued to grow in attendance.

==== Colombia ====
Since 1982, Bógotas pride parade has been held in Colombias capital, only pausing in 2020 for pandemic reasons. One of the biggest pride events in Latin America, Bogotá pride was attended by over 100,000 people in 2023. The same year, 40 pride events were held in other Colombian towns.

==== Guyana ====
Guyana held its first pride parade in June 2018. It was the first in the Anglophone Caribbean and was successfully staged in spite of religious opposition.

== Largest pride events ==
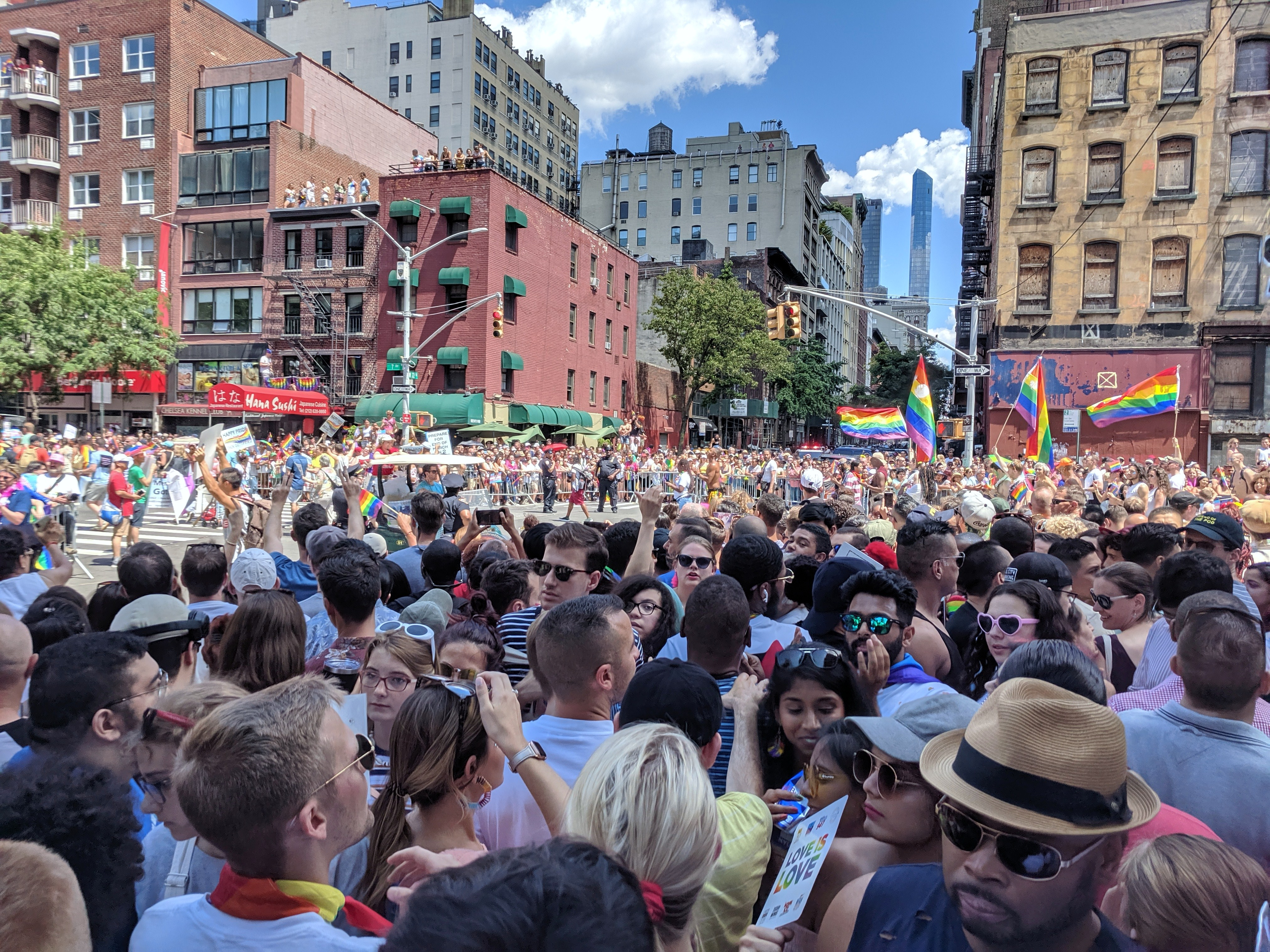
An estimated 5 million people attended Stonewall 50 – WorldPride NYC 2019, the world's largest LGBTQ event in history, with 4 million at the NYC Pride March.

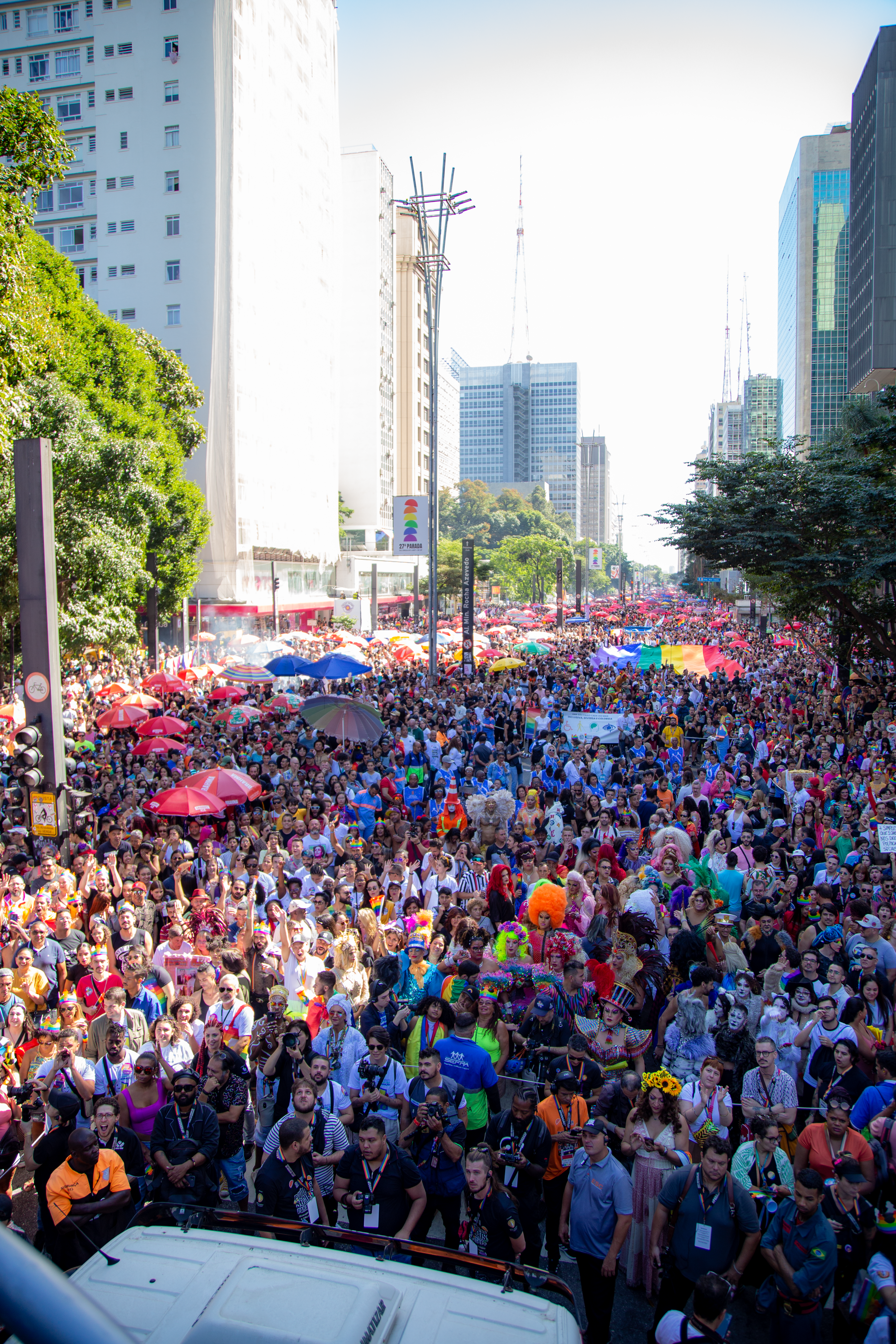
Parada do Orgulho LBGT+, in São Paulo, Brazil, is listed by Guinness World Records as the world's largest Pride parade.

Although estimating crowd size is an imprecise science, as of June 2019, New York City's NYC Pride March is North America's biggest Pride parade. The parade had 2.1 million people in 2015, which rose to 2.5 million in 2016. In 2018, attendance was estimated around 2 million. For Stonewall 50 – WorldPride NYC 2019 an estimated 5 million took part over the final weekend, with 4 million in attendance at the NYC Pride March.

São Paulo, Brazil's, event, Parada do Orgulho GLBT de São Paulo, is South America's largest, and was listed by Guinness World Records as the world's largest Pride parade in 2006 with 2.5 million people. It broke the Guinness record in 2009 with four million attendees. It kept the title from 2006 to at least 2016. It had up to five million attendees in 2017. As of June 2019, it had 3 to 5 million each year. In 2019, it had 3 million.

The Tokyo Rainbow Pride parade in Japan is one of the largest Pride parades in Asia.

In 2020, due to the COVID-19 coronavirus pandemic, most Pride parades and events were either cancelled or held online. One of the exceptions was Taiwan Pride, held on October 31, 2020, with the country having contained the virus outside its borders and therefore becoming the largest Pride event in the world for that year.

As of June 2019, Spain's Madrid Pride, Orgullo Gay de Madrid (MADO), is Europe's biggest; it had 3.5 million attendees when it hosted WorldPride in 2017.

As of June 2019, the largest LGBTQ events include:

- in Asia, it is Taiwan Pride in Taipei;
- in the Middle East, it is Tel Aviv Pride in Israel;
- in Oceania, it is Australia's Sydney Mardi Gras Parade;
- in Africa, it is South Africa's Johannesburg Pride.

== Opposition ==
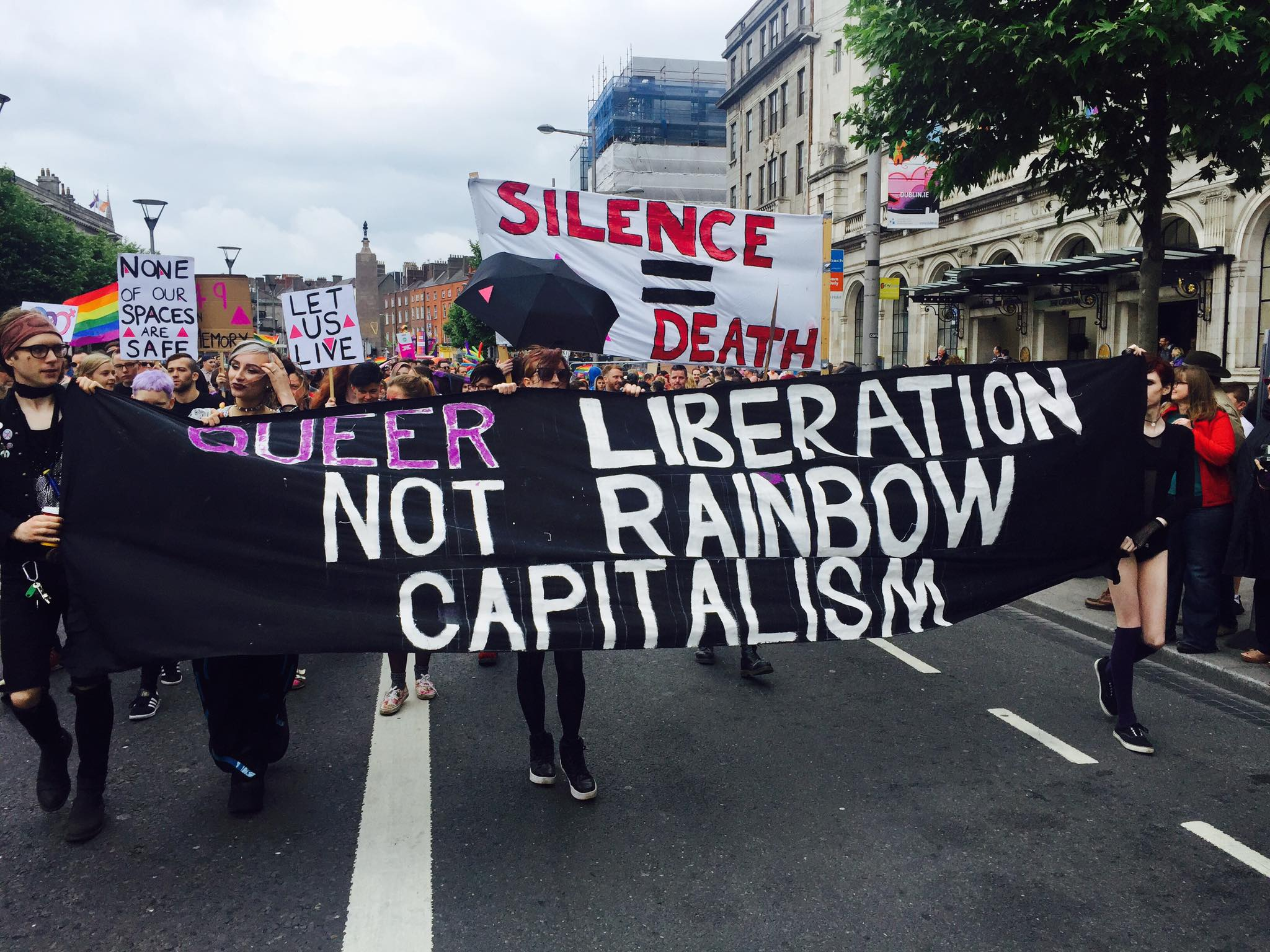
Queer activists at LGBTQ Pride in Dublin, Ireland 2016

There is opposition to pride events both within LGBT and mainstream populations.

Critics, such as Gay Shame, charge the parades with an undue emphasis on sex and fetish-related interests, which they see as counterproductive to LGBT interests, and expose the "gay community" to ridicule.

Various critics have denounced what they view as a merchandization of Pride parades, while some religious and cultural groups oppose Pride parades on ideological grounds, and view LGBTQ+ identities and relationships as contrary to their beliefs and traditions. These objections often lead to tensions and conflicts during Pride events, as LGBTQ+ individuals and their allies assert their rights to visibility and inclusion.

Social conservatives are sometimes opposed to such events because they view them to be contrary to public morality. This belief is partly based on certain displays often found in the parades, such as public nudity, BDSM paraphernalia, and other sexualized features. Within the academic community, there has been criticism that the parades actually set to strengthen homosexual-heterosexual divides and increase essentialist views. In some countries pride parades have been banned, including Russia, Turkey, and Poland.

As of June 2025, Pride parades are banned in the following places:

China

- Shanghai Pride (2020–present)

Hungary

- Budapest Pride (2025–present)

In spite of the ban, a pride parade still was held in 2025, on June 28. The organisers claim that a record 200,000 persons may have participated in the parade. The organisers faced up to 1 year in prison, and attendees risked a fine of up to €500.

Russia

- Moscow Pride (2008–present)

Turkey

- Istanbul Pride (2015–present)
- Ankara Pride (2017–present)
- Adana Pride (2018–present)
- Antalya Pride (2019–present)
- Izmir Pride (2019–present)
- Mersin Pride (2019–present)
- Eskişehir Pride (2021–present)

== See also ==
- Bear (gay culture) – LGBTQ slang and cultural identifier for large, hairy men
- Black gay pride – Movement in the United States for Black people in the LGBTQ+ community
- Circuit party – Large dance event
- Córdoba Pride – Pride march in Córdoba, Argentina
- Lisbon Pride – Gay Pride Parade in Lisbon, Portugal
- Peace flag – Proposed flag to represent world peace
- Pride Flag – Common symbol of the LGBTQ community
- Pride Month – Monthlong observance celebrating LGBTQIA+ culture
- Rio LGBTI Pride Parade – Pride Parade in Brazil
- Straight pride – Countermovement to LGBTQ+ pride movements and events
- Trans march – Annual transgender community marches
- LGBT pride in Ecuador
