= LGBTQ rights in Croatia =

- Location of Croatia (dark green) – in Europe (light green & dark grey) – in the European Union (light green) – [Legend]
- Legal status: Legal since 1977, age of consent equalized in 1998
- Gender identity: Changing legal gender is permitted by the law
- Military: Allowed to openly serve
- Discrimination protections: Sexual orientation, gender identity and gender expression protections (see below)

Family rights
- Recognition of relationships: Unregistered cohabitation since 2003, Life partnership since 2014
- Restrictions: Constitution bans same-sex marriage since the 2013 referendum.
- Adoption: Full adoption rights since 2022

Lesbian, gay, bisexual, transgender, and queer (LGBTQ) rights in Croatia have expanded since the turn of the 21st century, especially in the 2010s and 2020s, and are considered some of the most advanced among the ex-socialist and Yugosphere countries. However, LGBTQ people may still face some legal challenges not experienced by non-LGBTQ residents. The status of same-sex relationships was first formally recognized in 2003 under a law dealing with unregistered cohabitations. As a result of a 2013 referendum, the Constitution of Croatia defines marriage solely as a union between a woman and man, effectively prohibiting same-sex marriage. Since the introduction of the Life Partnership Act in 2014, same-sex couples have effectively enjoyed rights equal to heterosexual married couples in almost all of its aspects, except adoption until 2022. In 2022, a final court judgement allowed same-sex adoption (both stepchild and joint adoptions) under the same conditions as for mixed-sex couples. Same-sex couples in Croatia can also apply for foster care since 2020. Since 2022, same-sex couples enjoy rights equivalent to those in Western European countries, differing only in the terminology of the union — “life partnership” rather than “marriage.”. Croatian law forbids all discrimination on the grounds of sexual orientation, gender identity, and gender expression in all civil and state matters; any such identity is considered a private matter, and such information gathering for any purpose is forbidden as well.

Centre-left, centre, liberal and green political parties have generally been the main proponents of LGBTQ rights promulgation, while right-wing, centre-right and Christian democratic political parties and movements with ties to the Roman Catholic Church have been in opposition to or moderation of the extension of rights. In 2024, the International Lesbian, Gay, Bisexual, Trans and Intersex Association (ILGA) ranked Croatia seventeenth in terms of LGBTQ rights out of 49 observed European countries, which represented an improvement compared to the previous year's position of eighteenth place. Croatia is among 11 member countries that make up an LGBTQ Core Group at the United Nations on Ending Violence and Discrimination. Several LGBT+ related bills that codify and expand on existing rights were introduced in 2023 by the opposition, notably the We can! party (Croatian: Možemo!) and their allies. These included the legal recognition of same-sex marriage in all but name, the right to apply for foster care, the right to apply to adopt children, more inclusive IVF access, easier legal gender change, help for hate crime victims, better legal protection for LGBTQ+ people and legal recognition of parenthood for children adopted by same-sex couples. None of the proposed bills has passed legislation as of January 2024.

== LGBTQ history in Croatia ==
The Adriatic Republic of Ragusa introduced the death penalty for sodomy in 1474 as a response to stereotypical fears that Ottoman conquests in the region will lead to the spread of homosexuality.

=== 19th and 20th century ===
The Penal Code established on 27 May 1852 in the Habsburg Kingdom of Croatia (the first modern one in Croatian) did not specify homosexuality as a crime. A subsequent draft of the new Penal Code for 1879 for the Kingdom of Croatia-Slavonia suggested male homosexual acts be punished with up to five years of prison, but the draft was never formally adopted.

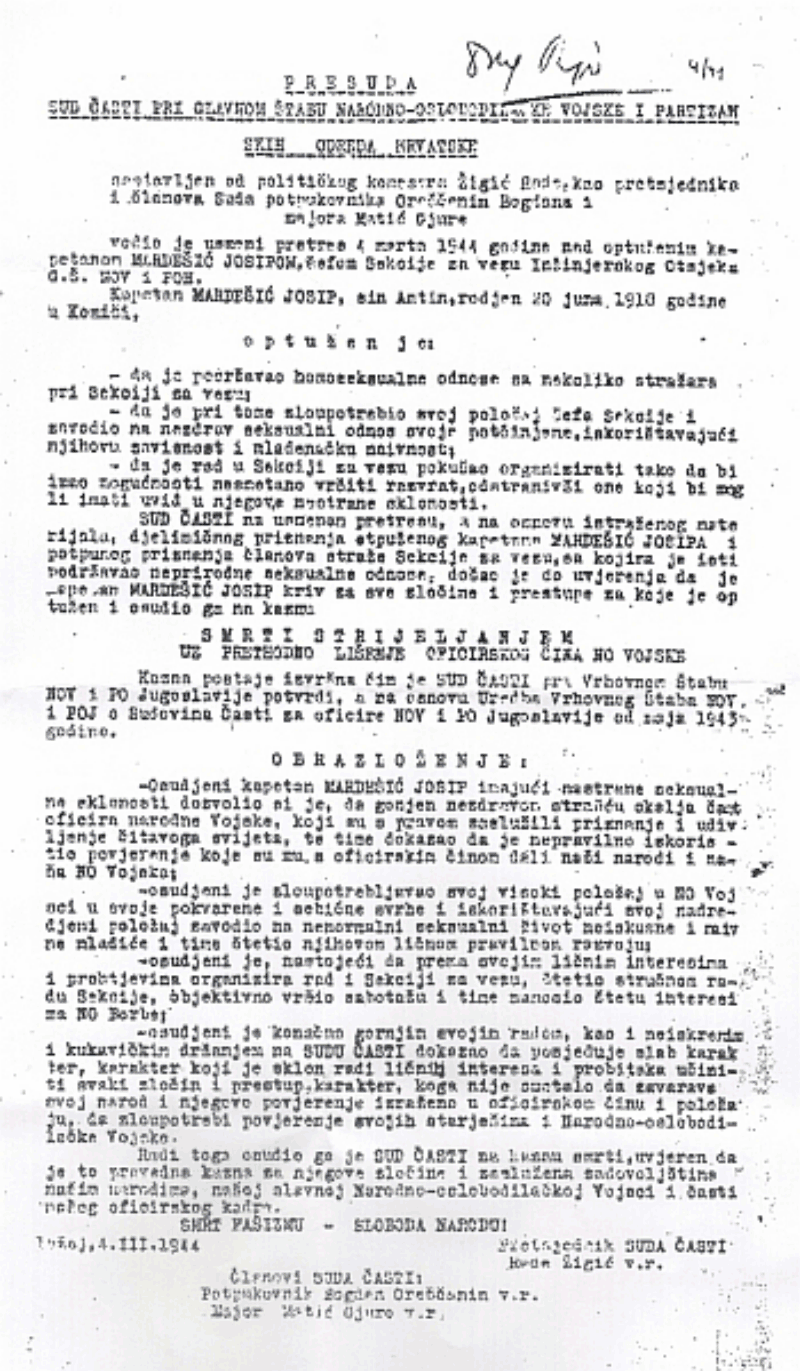
Partisan court martial verdict from 1944: Partisan captain Josip Mardešić found guilty and sentenced to death because of his homosexuality

During World War II, homosexual persons were prosecuted under various fascist regimes, but there is no record of organized persecution of homosexuals in the fascist Independent State of Croatia, whose laws did not explicitly contain a regulation directed against them. The communist Yugoslav Partisans, however, issued at least one death sentence against a homosexual, Josip Mardešić, the commander of the Croatian Partisans' communication network until early 1944, when he was discovered to have had affairs with his male subordinates. Mardešić's sexual partners were not executed, only expelled from the Communist Party and reprimanded.

=== Socialist Republic of Croatia ===
During the period when Croatia was part of the Socialist Federal Republic of Yugoslavia, male homosexual acts were made illegal and punishable with up to two years of prison under the Penal Code of 9 March 1951. However, the repression of homosexuals in Yugoslavia effectively began immediately after the end of the war. Homosexuals, labeled by communists as "enemies of the system", were also prohibited from joining the Communist Party of Yugoslavia.

This situation changed when Croatia and other republics gained more control over their own legislature. Constitutional reforms in Yugoslavia in 1974 resulted in the abolishment of the federal Penal Code, allowing every republic to create its own. The Socialist Republic of Croatia created its own Code in 1977, and decriminalized homosexual activity. The Croatian Medical Chamber removed homosexuality from its list of mental disorders in 1973 – four years before the introduction of the new Penal Code, and seventeen years before the World Health Organization did the same. Even though being a member of Yugoslavia meant Croatia was a communist country, it was never under the Iron Curtain, thus making it a relatively open country that was influenced by social changes in the wider developed world.

The 1980s brought more visibility to LGBT people. In 1985, Toni Marošević became the first openly gay media person, and briefly hosted a radio show on the Omladinski radio radio station that dealt with marginal socio-political issues. He later revealed that he had been asked on several occasions by the League of Communists of Croatia to form an LGBT faction of the party. The first lesbian association in Croatia, the "Lila initiative", was formed in 1989, but ceased to exist a year later.

=== Post-communist era ===
The 1990s brought a slowdown in terms of the progression of LGBT rights mainly as a result of the breakup of Yugoslavia followed by the Croatian War of Independence when many Croatian LGBT people, then involved in various feminist, peace and green organizations, joined the anti-war campaign within Croatia. Following Croatian independence, in 1992 the first LGBT association was officially formed, under the name of LIGMA (lezbijska i gej akcija, 'lesbian and gay action', sometimes referred to in English as the Lesbian and Gay Men's Association). This only lasted until 1997 as the socio-political climate of the time proved hostile to the advancement of gay rights. The most significant event that occurred in the 1990s was the equalization of the age of consent for all sexual activity in 1998 (both heterosexual and homosexual). The situation stagnated until 2000 when a new government coalition, consisting mainly of parties of the centre-left and led by Ivica Račan, took power from the HDZ after their ten-year rule. The new government coalition brought attention to rights of LGBT citizens of Croatia with the introduction of the Same-sex community law in 2003.

The 2000s proved a turning point for LGBT history in Croatia with the formation of several LGBT associations (with the Rijeka-based Lesbian organisation Rijeka - LORI in 2000 and ISKORAK in 2002 being among the first); the introduction of unregistered cohabitations; the outlawing of all anti-LGBT discrimination (including recognition of hate-crime based on sexual orientation and gender identity); and the first gay pride event in Zagreb in 2002 during which a group of extremists attacked a number of marchers. Despite that, later marches drew thousands of participants without incidents. Several political parties as well as both national presidents elected in 2000s have shown public support for LGBT rights, with some politicians even actively participating in Gay Pride events on a regular basis.

In early 2005 the Sabor rejected a registered partnerships proposal put forward by Šime Lučin (SDP) and the independent Ivo Banac. Lucija Čikeš MP, a member of the then-ruling HDZ, called for the proposal to be dropped because "the whole universe is heterosexual, from the atom and the smallest particle; from a fly to an elephant". Another HDZ MP objected on the grounds that, "85% of the population considers itself Catholic and the Church is against heterosexual and homosexual equality". However, the medical and physical professions, and the media more generally rejected these statements in opposition, warning that all the members of the Sabor had a duty to vote according to the Constitution which bans discrimination on the grounds of sexual orientation.

In 2009, the governing Croatian Democratic Union (HDZ) party passed a controversial law restricting access to in vitro fertilisation (IVF) solely to married couples and heterosexual couples who could prove that they had been cohabitating for at least three years. HDZ initially attempted to pass the law restricting access to IVF solely to married couples, but due to strong public pressure HDZ amended the proposed law to allow access to IVF for non-married heterosexual couples as well. The Catholic Church actively supported the first legislative proposal, arguing that access to IVF should only be granted to married couples. As HDZ is a self-declared Christian democratic party, the then Minister of Health and Social Welfare, Darko Milinović, indicated that the government took the Church's position on the matter seriously.

In 2009, the European Committee on Social Rights found several discriminatory statements in a biology course textbook mandatory in Croatian schools. It ruled that the statements violated Croatia's obligations under the European Social Charter.

The 2010s have been marked with a second annual gay pride event in Croatia in the city of Split, a third in Osijek, and the return in 2011 of the centre-left coalition sympathetic to gay rights after the eight-year rule by the conservative-led coalition. The Croatian Government also introduced a Life Partnership Act which makes same-sex couples effectively equal to married couples in everything except full adoption rights. In November 2010, the European Commission's annual progress report on Croatia's candidacy to the EU stated the number of homophobic incidents in Croatia provided concern, and that further effort had to be made in combating hate crime. A 2010 resolution by the European Parliament expressed "concern at the resentment against the LGBT minority in Croatia, evidenced most recently by homophobic attacks on participants in the LGBT Pride parade in Zagreb; urges the Croatian authorities to condemn and prosecute political hatred and violence against any minority; and invites the Croatian Government to implement and enforce the Anti-Discrimination Law".

In December 2011, the newly elected Kukuriku coalition government announced that the modernisation of the IVF law would be one of its first priorities. Proposed changes to the law would allow single women, whose infertility was treated unsuccessfully, access to IVF as well. Other changes were also proposed concerning the freezing of embryos and the fertilization of eggs. The Catholic Church immediately indicated its public oppositions to these changes, stating that they had not been involved in the discussions as much as they should like to have been. The Church subsequently initiated a petition against the legislation, but the Minister of Health, Rajko Ostojić, announced that the law would be going ahead with no compromises. When asked about his attitude on lesbian couples having access to IVF Ostojić said: "Gay is OK!" On 13 July 2012, the new law came into force with 88 MPs voting in favour, 45 voting against, and 2 abstentions. A number of HNS MPs who are also members of the ruling coalition wanted lesbian couples to be included in the legal change as well, and expressed disappointment that their amendment was not ultimately accepted. Since the new law only allowed access to IVF to women who were either married or single and infertile, the law excluded lesbian couples. However, the government justified the exclusion by arguing that the legislative change was only intended to deal with the issue of infertility.

In July 2012, the Municipal Court in Varaždin dealt with a case of discrimination and harassment on the grounds of sexual orientation against a professor at the Faculty of Organization and Informatics at the University of Zagreb. The case was the first report of discrimination based on sexual orientation in accordance with the Anti-Discrimination Act. The court found that there had indeed been discrimination and harassment against the victim in the workplace, and the Faculty was prohibited from further hindering the victim's professional advancement.

A lobby group established in 2013, "In the Name of the Family", led the call to change the Croatian national constitution so that marriage can only be defined as a union between a man and a woman. The Roman Catholic Church played a prominent role in this political campaign, and Cardinal Josip Bozanić of Zagreb issued a letter to be read in churches reminding people that "Marriage is the only union enabling procreation". Subsequently, a national referendum was held on 1 December 2013 where voters approved the change. Franko Dota, a gay rights activist, criticised the results, arguing that it was intended "to humiliate the gay population, and to strike against the progress of the past decades". Stephen Bartulica, a proponent of the referendum and a professor at the Catholic University of Croatia, countered that "the vote was an attempt to show that there is strong opposition" to "gay marriage and adoption by gays". The prime minister, Zoran Milanović, was unhappy that the referendum had taken place at all, saying, "I think it did not make us any better, smarter or prettier."

On 1 March 2013, the Minister for Science, Education and Sports, Željko Jovanović, announced that his ministry would begin an action to remove all homophobic content from books used in both elementary and high schools. He wanted to especially target religious education books (religious education in Croatian schools is an optional course).

On 11 May 2012, Milanović announced a further expansion to the rights of same-sex couples through a new law which would replace the existing unregistered cohabitation legislation. The Sabor subsequently passed the "Life Partnership Act" on 15 July 2014. This law effectively made same-sex couples equal to heterosexual married couples in everything except adoption rights. An institution similar to step-child adoption called "partner-guardian" was created to deal with the care of children.

In March 2014, it was announced that Croatia had granted asylum for the first time to a person persecuted on the basis of their sexual orientation – a young man from Uganda who had fled the country as a result of the Uganda Anti-homosexuality Act.

The first life partnership in Croatia took place in Zagreb on 5 September 2014 between two men. Within a year of the Sabor passing the law 80 life partnerships were conducted. By the end of 2016 that number had risen to 174. In October 2018, it was reported that a total of 262 life partnerships had been conducted in Croatia between September 2014 and June 2018.

In May 2016, Zagreb Pride published the first Croatian guide for same-sex couples, LGBT parents and families named "We Have a Family!". The publication was intended for informing same-sex partners and LGBT parents and contains information about life partnership, same-sex couples rights and the possibilities of planning LGBTIQ parenting in Croatia, as well as parenting stories written based on the experience of actual Croatian LGBT parents. The publication was financed by the European Union and the Government of Croatia.

In December 2016, scientists Antonija Maričić, Marina Štambuk, Maja Tadić Vujčić and Sandra Tolić published a book, I'm Not "Gay Mom", I'm Mom, in which they presented results of their research on the position of the LGBT families in Croatia, first such in the country. It provides insight into the types and characteristics of family communities, the quality of parenting, family climate and quality of relationships, a psychosocial adaptation of children, as well as experiences of stigmatization and discrimination and support in the contemporary Croatian society.

The organization Rainbow Families (Croatian: Dugine obitelji) gathers LGBT couples and individuals who have or want to have children. It was organized by Zagreb Pride in 2011 as an informal group for psychosocial support led by psychologists Iskra Pejić and Mateja Popov. It was formally registered with the Ministry of Public Administration in 2017. In 2018, it gathered around 20 LGBT families with children. On 18 January 2018, Rainbow Families published the first picture book depicting same-sex couples with children in the Balkans, titled My Rainbow Family. It was authored by Maja Škvorc and Ivo Šegota, and illustrated by Borna Nikola Žeželj. The picture book depicts thumbnails from the lives of two children: girl Ana, who has two dads, and boy Roko, who has two mothers. The aim of the picture book was to strengthen the social integration of children with same-sex parents and to promote tolerance and respect for diversity. It is intended for children of preschool age. The first edition of 500 copies was printed with the financial support of the French Embassy to Croatia and distributed for free to interested citizens and organizations. Since the entire first edition was distributed almost immediately, the organization started a crowdfunding campaign with an intention to collect funds for publishing 1000 new free hardback copies in both Croatian and English, as well as 1,000 copies of a new coloring book. In just under 24 hours, they surpassed two targeted goals and received more than $7,000 of initial $3,000 goal.

In September 2020 gay couple Mladen Kožić and Ivo Šegota became the first same-sex foster parents in history of Croatia, after a three-year long legal battle. They became foster parents to two children.

In 2022, a final court judgement allows same-sex couples to adopt children (both stepchild and joint adoptions).

== Legality of same-sex sexual activity ==
Same-sex sexual activity was legalised in 1977 setting the age of consent at 18 for homosexuals and 14 for heterosexuals. The age of consent was then equalised in 1998 when it was set at 14 by the Croatian Penal Code for everyone, and later raised to 15 with the introduction of a new Penal Code on 1 January 2013. There is an exemption to this rule if the age difference between the partners is three years or less.

== Recognition of same-sex relationships ==
Same-sex relationships have legally been recognized since 2003, when the same-sex community law was passed. The law granted same-sex partners who have been cohabiting for at least three years similar rights to those enjoyed by unmarried cohabiting opposite-sex partners in terms of inheritance and financial support. However, the right to adopt was not included, nor any other rights included under family law – instead separate legislation has been created to deal with this point. In addition it was not permitted to formally register these same-sex relationships, nor to claim additional rights in terms of tax, joint property, health insurance, pensions etc.

Although same-sex marriages have been banned since the 2013 constitutional referendum, the twelfth government of Croatia introduced the Life Partnership act in 2014, which granted same-sex couples the same rights and obligations heterosexual married couples have, excluding the ability to adopt children. The ability to adopt children (both stepchild and joint adoptions) by same-sex couples has been possible since 2022 after a final court judgement.

To step into a life partnership, there are several conditions that have to be met:

- both partners have to be of the same gender,
- both partners have to be at least 18 years old,
- both partners have to consent to the formation of a partnership.

Furthermore, an informal life partnership is formed if two partners are in a continuous relationship for three or more years. This type of interpersonal relationship grants the same rights a domestic partnership provides to unmarried heterosexual couples.

== Adoption and parenting ==
Since 2022, full LGBTQ adoption in Croatia is legal for same-sex life partners in same-sex life partnerships. On 5 May 2021, it was reported that the Administrative Court in Zagreb ruled in favour of a same-sex couple (Mladen Kožić and Ivo Šegota) being able to adopt. After initially being rejected by the Department of Social Care due to being in a Life Partnership in 2016, they sued the Ministry of Demographics, Family, Youth and Social Policy. The verdict explicitly stated that they must not be discriminated based on the fact they are a same-sex couple in a Life Partnership. Said Ministry has decided to appeal the court ruling. On 26 May 2022, the High Administrative Court rejected the appeal, the ruling is now final.

Despite the ruling by the Administrative Court, Croatia still doesn't have a national law to regulate same-sex adoptions. Protections for same-sex adoptions have so far only come from the courts, not from the Parliament or the government.

The Medically Supported Fertilization Law (Croatian: Zakon o medicinski pomognutoj oplodnji) limits access to IVF to married heterosexual couples and single women whose infertility has been unsuccessfully treated, which effectively excludes same-sex couples. Contrariwise, Article 68 of the Life Partnership Act grants life partners the same rights (and obligations) married heterosexual couples have concerning health insurance and healthcare, and prohibits "adverse treatment of life partnerships" in the same areas.

=== Partner-guardianship and parental responsibilities ===
A life partner who is not a legal parent of their partner's child or children can gain parental responsibilities on a temporary or permanent basis. As part of a "life partnership", the parent or parents of a child can temporarily entrust their life partner (who is not a biological parent) with parental rights. If those rights last beyond 30 days, then the decision must be certified by a notary. Under this situation, while the parental rights endure then the parent/parents and the life partner must agree collectively on decisions important for the child's well-being. In case of a dissolution of a life partnership, the partner who is not the biological parent can maintain a personal relationship with the child provided the court decides it is in the child's best interest.

"Partner-guardianship" is a mechanism created under the Life Partnership Act that enables a life partner who is not a biological parent to gain permanent parental rights, and is thus similar to stepchild adoption. Such a relationship between the non-parent life partner and the child may be continued if the parent-partner dies (under the condition that the other parent has also died), is considered unknown, or has lost their parental responsibilities due to child abuse. However, the non-parent life partner can also ask for the establishment of partner-guardianship while the parent-partner is alive under the condition that the other parent is considered unknown or has lost parental responsibilities due to child abuse.

The partner-guardian receives full parental responsibility as is the case with stepchild adoption, and is registered on the child's birth certificate as their partner-guardian. Partner-guardianship is a permanent next-of-kin relationship with all the rights, responsibilities, and legal standing as that of a parent and a child. The first case of a partner-guardianship was reported in July 2015.

=== Foster care ===
In December 2018, the Croatian Parliament passed The Act on Fostering with 72 votes for, 4 against and 6 abstainers.™Croatian gay rights groups slammed a new law that blocks same sex couples from becoming foster parents, although ahead of the vote, more than 200 prominent Croatian psychologists and sociologists in a statement voiced hope that lawmakers would not be led by "prejudices and stereotypes" and deprive children of a chance to be paired with foster parents "regardless of their sexual orientation". The activists vowed to fight it in the country's top court. Afterwards, Mladen Kožić and Ivo Šegota, a gay couple aspiring to become foster parents, wrote an open letter to the government saying that by "refusing to include life partners' families in the law ... you further boosted stigma and gave it a legal framework." The law came into effect on 1 January 2019.

On 20 December 2019 it was reported that aforementioned couple did win a court battle that allowed them to become foster parents. Zagreb Administrative Court annulled previous decisions including the refusals of the Center for Social Welfare and the ministry. The court decision is final, and no appeal is allowed. Their attorney Sanja Bezbradica Jelavić stated: "The court's decision is binding, and an appeal is not allowed, so this judgment is final. The written ruling has not yet arrived, but as stated during the announcement, the court accepted our argument in the lawsuit, based on Croatian regulations and the European Convention on Human Rights. As a result, the court ordered the relevant government agencies to implement the new decision in accordance with the judgment. We believe that the agencies will respect the court decision."

However, despite this decision, Center for Social Welfare rejected their application for the second time. The case was put before the Constitutional Court of Croatia, and on 7 February 2020 it reached the decision that same-sex couples have the right to be foster parents. In its summary, the Constitutional Court of Croatia says: "The Constitutional Court found that the impugned legal provisions which left out ('silenced') a certain social group produces general discriminatory consequences against same-sex persons living in formal and informal life partnerships, which is constitutionally unacceptable." The president of the Constitutional Court of Croatia Miroslav Šeparović further stated:""The point of this decision is that opportunity to provide foster care service must be given to everyone under the same conditions, regardless of whether the potential foster parents are of same-sex orientation. This does not mean that they are privileged, but their foster care must be allowed if they meet the legal requirements". The Constitutional Court did not repeal the challenged legal provisions, arguing that this would create a legal loophole, but stated unequivocally that the exclusion of same-sex couples from foster care was discriminatory and unconstitutional, and provided clear instructions to the courts, social welfare centers, and other decision-making bodies regarding these issues and indicated they must not exclude applicants based on their life partnership status. Constitutional judges stressed that, despite not intervening in the legal text, "courts or other competent bodies that directly decide on individual rights and obligations of citizens in resolving individual cases are obliged to interpret and apply laws in accordance with their meaning and legitimate purpose, to make those decisions on the basis of the constitution, laws, international treaties and other sources of law." Nine judges voted for this decision, and four were against. Two out of those four were of an opinion that Sabor should be allowed to change the current Foster Care act, and the other two were of an opinion that the law did not discriminate same-sex couples.

== Gender identity and expression ==
Gender transition is legal in Croatia, and birth certificates may be legally amended to recognise this. Up until June 2013 the change of gender always had to be stated on an individual's birth certificate. However, on 29 May 2012 it was announced that the government would take extra steps to protect transsexual and transgender people. Under the new rules, the undertaking of sex reassignment surgery no longer has to be stated on an individual's birth certificate, thus ensuring that such information remains private. This is also the case for people who have not formally undergone sex reassignment surgery, but have nevertheless undertaken hormone replacement therapy. The change in the law was proposed by the Kukuriku coalition while they were in opposition in 2010, but was categorically rejected by the ruling right-wing HDZ at the time. The new law took effect on 29 June 2013.

== Discrimination protections ==
The first anti-discrimination directives that prohibit discrimination based on sexual orientation have been included since 2003 in the Gender Equality Law:

- Gender Equality Law (e.g. Article 6).

The 2008 Anti-Discrimination Act also includes gender identity and gender expression on the list of protected categories against discrimination when it comes to access to either public and private services or to establishments serving the public. Act also applies in all other areas. It took effect on 1 January 2009.

In 2023, the Constitutional Court of Croatia, in its verdict, declared that same-sex civil unions (life partnerships) are constitutional and that discrimination based on a person's sexual orientation is prohibited in the Croatian Constitution in Article 14 under the "other grounds" clause.

=== Hate crime legislation ===
Since 2006, the country has had hate crime legislation in place which covers sexual orientation. The law was first applied in 2007, when a man who violently attacked the Zagreb Pride parade using Molotov cocktails was convicted and sentenced to 14 months in prison. On 1 January 2013 new Penal Code has been introduced with the recognition of a hate crime based on a gender identity.

==== Cooperation with the police ====
LGBTQ associations Zagreb Pride, Iskorak and Kontra have been cooperating with the police since 2006 when Croatia first recognized hate crimes based on sexual orientation. As a result of that cooperation the police have included education about hate crimes against LGBT persons in their training curriculum in 2013. In April of the same year the Minister of the Interior, Ranko Ostojić, together with officials from his ministry launched a national campaign alongside Iskorak and Kontra to encourage LGBT persons to report hate crimes. The campaign has included city light billboards in four cities (Zagreb, Split, Pula, and Osijek), handing out leaflets to citizens in those four cities, and distributing leaflets within police stations across the country.

== Blood donation ==
The regulations that govern the Croatian institute for transfusions (Hrvatski zavod za transfuzijsku medicinu) in practice restrict gay and bi men's ability to donate blood indefinitely. A 1998 bylaw on blood components had expressly banned people who practised sexual acts with the persons of the same sex from donating blood, but this bylaw was rescinded with the introduction of a new Law on blood in 2006. A 2007 bylaw on blood products includes among the criteria for a permanent rejection of allogeneic dose providers the generic category of "people whose sexual behavior puts them at a high risk of getting blood-borne infectious diseases", and in turn the institute's blood donation restrictions on men who have sex with men, as of 2021, are categorized under "behaviors or activities that expose them to risk of contracting blood-borne infectious diseases".

== Military service ==
LGB persons are not banned from participation in military service. Ministry of Defence has no internal rules regarding LGB persons, but it follows regulation at the state level which explicitly prohibits discrimination on the basis of sexual orientation. Some media reports have suggested that most gay men serving in the military generally decide to keep their sexual orientation private, but there have also been reports suggesting that the Croatian Armed Forces take discrimination very seriously and will not tolerate homophobia among its personnel.

=== Discrimination cases ===
The only known case of discrimination in the Croatian Army is the 1998 case of recruit Aldin Petrić from Rijeka. In July 1998, Petrić answered his draft summons and reported to the barracks at Pula where he told his senior officer in a private conversation that he was gay; however, that information quickly spread through the barracks, which resulted in Petrić being subjected to abuse by his fellow soldiers and other officers. Petrić repeatedly asked to be transferred to another barracks but his requests were not met. On 22 July, Petrić was dismissed from the army because of "unspecified disturbance of sexual preference" (Code F65.9 from the 1992 ICD-10 Classification of Mental and Behavioral Disorders of the World Health Organization, which, however, has not specifically cited homosexuality as psychological disorder). Following Petrić's dismissal from Army, his parents found out about his homosexuality and expelled him from home. Petrić then sued Ministry of Defense for damages, citing "discriminatory policies, official impunity for the suffered abuse, and psychological trauma". In October 1998, the Ministry summoned Petrić once again in order for him to complete his military service which he refused fearing for his life. Afterwards Petrić sought and received political asylum in Canada.

There have been other attacks on LGBT persons, the last one, in 2021. In Split, a representative of the LGBT community was beaten, when he decided to swim in the sea. Two people attacked him, ran away and left him injured. The mayor of Split also reacted, strongly condemning the attack.

== Public opinion ==
The 2010 European Social Survey found that 38% of Croatians agreed with the statement that "gay men and lesbians should be free to live their own lives as they wish".

A poll in June 2011 showed that 38.3% of citizens supported the holding of gay pride events, while 53.5% remained opposed. However, a majority (51.3%) did not believe it was right to ban such events – while 41,2% thought they should be.

A June 2013 opinion poll suggested that 55.3% stated would vote yes in an upcoming referendum to constitutionally define marriage as a union between a man and a woman; with 31.1% voting no. However, in the event, almost 40% of the national population decided not to participate in the referendum.

A poll from November 2013 revealed that 59% of Croats think that marriage should be constitutionally defined as a union between a man and a woman, while 31% do not agree with the idea.

After the Life Partnership Act was passed in 2014, the opposition and groups opposed to LGBT rights claimed many registrars will wish to be exempted from performing life partnerships at registrars offices, and that private businesses such as florists, bakers or wedding planners will be forced to provide services to gay and lesbian couples. The deputy head of Zagreb City Office for General Administration Dragica Kovačić claimed no cases of registrars wishing to be exempted is known. There are 30 registrars in the City of Zagreb in charge of marriages and life partnerships, and at the registrars' meeting nobody raised an issue. Additionally, a survey was conducted in which private businesses were randomly phoned, asking whether they would refuse to provide services to gay and lesbian couples. Every business surveyed stated they would offer their services to those couples.

A survey of 1,000 people conducted in 2014 showed that 45.4% of respondents are strongly against and 15.5% are mainly against the legalisation of same-sex marriage in Croatia. 10.1% were strongly in favour, 6.9% mostly in favour, and 21.2% were neutral.

A survey conducted during the presidential campaign in December 2014 by the daily newspaper Večernji list found that 50.4% of people thought that the future president should support the current level of LGBT rights in Croatia, while 49.6% thought they should not.

Eurobarometer Discrimination in the EU in 2015 report concluded the following: 48% of people in Croatia believe that gay, lesbian, and bisexual people should have the same rights as heterosexual people, and 37% of them believe same-sex marriages should be allowed throughout Europe.

When asked about having a gay, lesbian or bisexual person in the highest elected political position results were as follows: 40% of the respondents were comfortable with the idea, 13% moderately comfortable, 6% indifferent, 38% uncomfortable, and 3% did not know. When asked the same question about transgender or transsexual person results were as follows: 33% were comfortable with the idea, 15% moderately comfortable, 40% uncomfortable, 6% indifferent, and 5% did not know.

Furthermore, when asked how they would feel if one of their colleagues at work were gay, lesbian or bisexual results were as follows: 48% respondents felt comfortable about the idea, 11% moderately comfortable, 31% uncomfortable, 5% indifferent, 4% said it depends, and 1% did not know. When it comes to working with a transgender or transsexual person results were as follows: 44% felt comfortable with the idea, 12% moderately comfortable, 31% uncomfortable, 6% were indifferent, 3% it would depend, and 4% did not know.

That a transgender or transsexual person should be able to change their civil documents to match their inner gender identity was agreeable to 44%, disagreeable to 39%, and 17% did not know.

64% of respondents agreed that school lessons and material should include information about diversity in terms of sexual orientation, and 63% agreed the same about gender identity.

In May 2016 ILGA published a survey about attitudes towards LGBT people conducted in 53 UN members (12 of those were European countries, including Croatia). When asked whether homosexuality should be a crime, 68% of people in Croatia strongly disagreed with that (second highest percentage after the Netherlands where 70% of people strongly disagreed), 4% somewhat disagreed, 19% were neutral, 4% somewhat agreed, and 5% strongly agreed (the lowest percentage of people who strongly agreed among European countries included in the survey). Furthermore, when asked whether they would be concerned about having an LGBT neighbor, 75% of people said they would have no concerns, 15% would be somewhat uncomfortable, and 10% very uncomfortable.

A poll by Pew Research Center published in May 2017 estimated that 31% of Croatians are in favour of same-sex marriage, while 64% opposed the idea. Support was higher among non-religious people (61%) than among Catholics (29%). Younger people were more likely than their elders to favour legal gay marriage (33% vs. 30%).

In the 2023 Eurobarometer, 42% of Croatians thought same-sex marriage should be allowed throughout Europe, and 39% agreed that "there is nothing wrong in a sexual relationship between two persons of the same sex". Furthermore, 35% of respondents agreed with the statement that "lesbian, gay, bisexual people should have the same rights as heterosexual people (marriage, adoption, parental rights)", with 60% still opposed.

== Living conditions ==
The capital city Zagreb is home to the biggest gay scene, including gay clubs and bars, plus many other places frequently advertised as gay-friendly. Zagreb is also home to the first LGBT centre in Croatia, and the "Queer Zagreb" organization, that among many other activities promotes equality through the Queer Zagreb festival, and Queer MoMenti (an ongoing monthly film program dedicated to LGBT cinema). Croatia's second LGBT centre was officially opened in Split on 24 May 2014, and the third one in Rijeka on 16 October 2014 called LGBTIQ+ Druga Rijeka. Other places that host LGBT parties, and are home to gay-friendly places such as bars, clubs, and beaches are Rijeka, Osijek, Hvar, Rab, Rovinj, Dubrovnik etc.

=== LGBTQ prides and other marches ===
==== Zagreb Pride ====
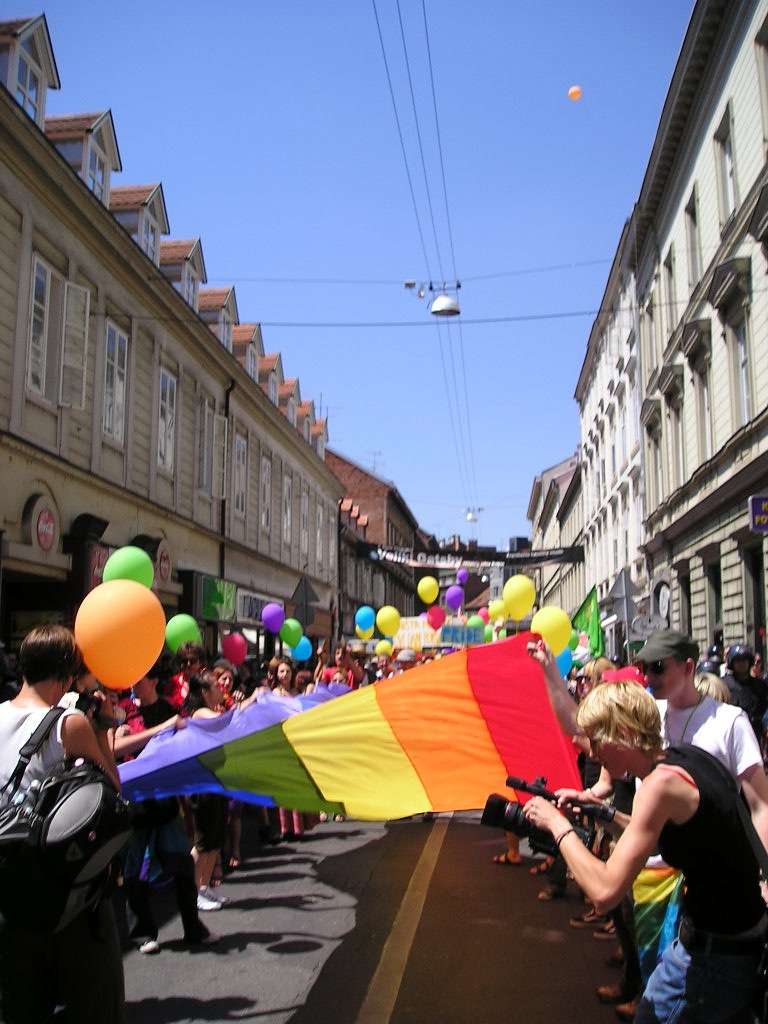
2007 Zagreb Pride

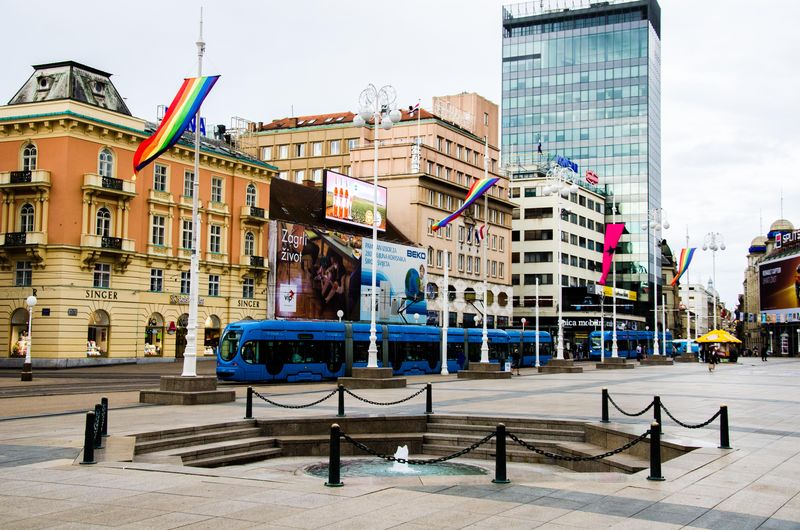
LGBT flags in Zagreb during the Zagreb Pride Week

The first pride in Croatia took place on 29 June 2002 in the capital city of Zagreb. Public support is growing and number of participants is also increasing rapidly year after year, but the marches have also experienced violent public opposition. In 2006, the march had a regional character, aimed at supporting those coming from countries where such manifestations are expressly forbidden by the authorities. The 2011 manifestation was the biggest Pride rally in Croatia at the time, and took place without any violent incidents. It was also reported that the number of policemen providing security at the event was lower than had been the case in previous years. As of summer 2019, the 2013 event was the biggest one so far, with 15,000 participants.

==== Split Pride ====
The first LGBT pride in Split took place on 11 June 2011. However, the march proved problematic as official security was not strong enough to prevent serious incidents, as a result of which LGBT attendees had to be led to safety. Several hundred anti-gay protesters were arrested, and the parade was eventually cancelled. Soon after the event, sections of the national media voiced supported for LGBT attendees, calling on everyone to "march in the upcoming Zagreb Pride". On 9 June 2012, several hundred participants marched in Rijeka, the third largest city in Croatia. The march was organised to support Split Pride. A second attempt at holding an event in 2012 was more successful, after receiving public support from the Croatian media, national celebrities, and politicians. Five ministers from the government and other public figures participated. In 2013, the march went ahead without a single incident, and it was the first time in Croatia that the mayor of the city participated.

==== Osijek Pride ====
The first LGBT pride march in Osijek took place on 6 September 2014. It was organized by the Osijek LGBT association LiberOs. There were no incidents, and over 300 people attended. The Minister of the Economy, as well as Serbian and Greek LGBT activists attended.

==== Karlovac Pride ====
The first pride in the city of Karlovac, organized by Marko Capan, took place on 3 June 2023. The mottos of the first Karlovac Pride were "Karlovac is different and open" and "Karlovac is tolerant and inclusive." A dozen of citizens were gathered and the event went without any incidents. The second Karlovac Pride was held on 8 June 2024. It was the first Pride to also feature a march through the city centre.

==== Pula Pride ====
The first Pride in Pula was organized by Udruga Proces and held on 22 June 2024. Around 500 people were gathered for the event. The event was also attended by Filip Zoričić, the mayor of Pula.

==== Other marches ====
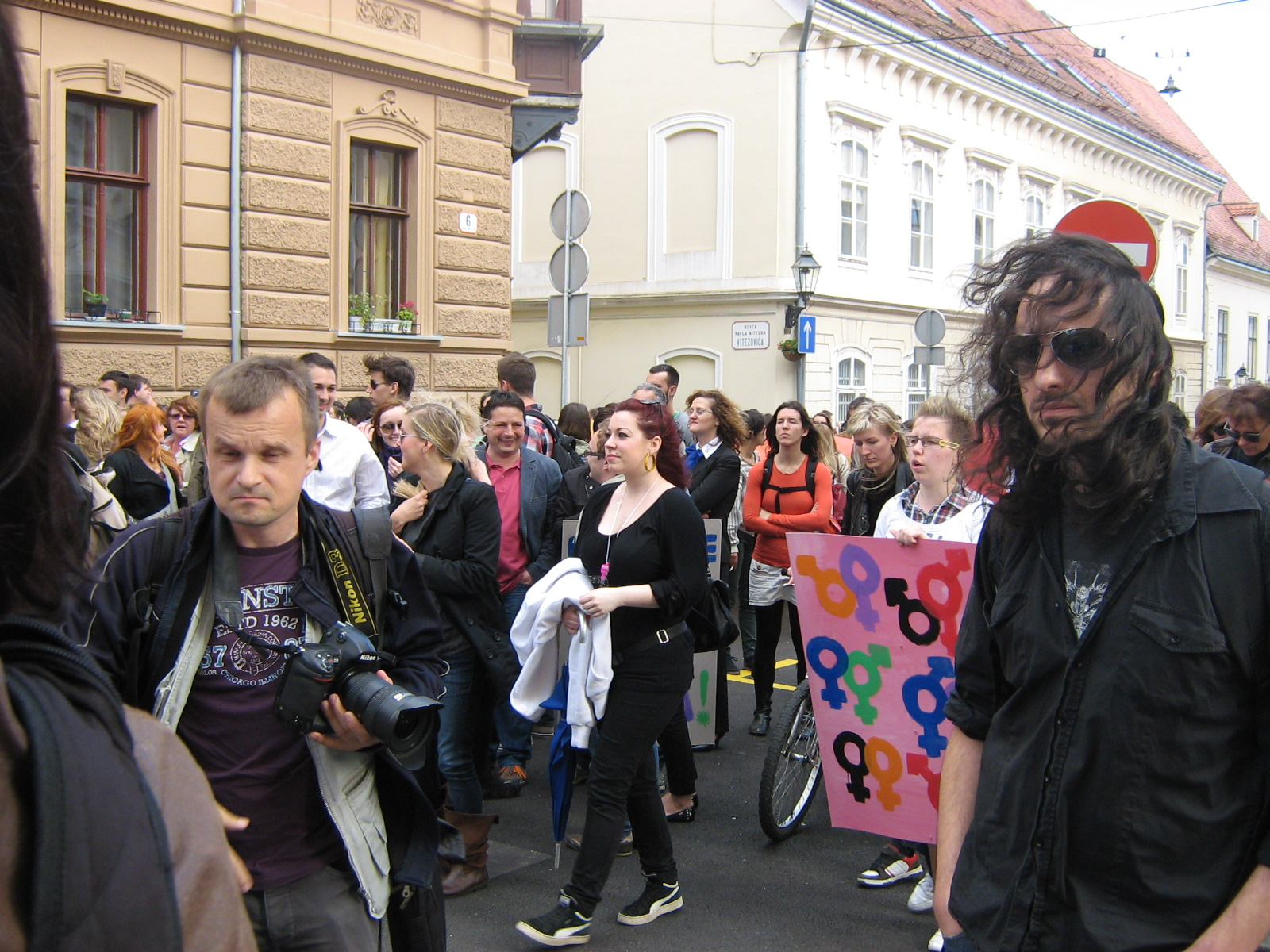
March for marriage equality, 2013

On 27 May 2013, around 1,500 participants in Zagreb marched in support of marriage equality from the park of Zrinjevac to St. Mark's Square, the seat of the Croatian Government, Croatian parliament, and the Constitutional Court of Croatia. On 30 November 2013, one day before the referendum took place, around a thousand people marched in the city of Zagreb in support of marriage equality. Marches of support also took place in Pula, Split, and Rijeka gathering together hundreds of people.

===== Balkans Trans Inter March =====
The first ever Trans Inter march in the Balkans took place in Zagreb on 30 March 2019. Around 300 people marched through the streets of Zagreb calling for better protection of intersex children, and general end to discrimination. Guest from Slovenia, Serbia, Romania, Germany, United Kingdom, Switzerland, and Bosnia and Herzegovina joined the march. It was organized by Trans Aid, Trans Network Balkans, and Spektra. The march took place without any incidents.

== Politics ==
=== Proponents of LGBT rights ===
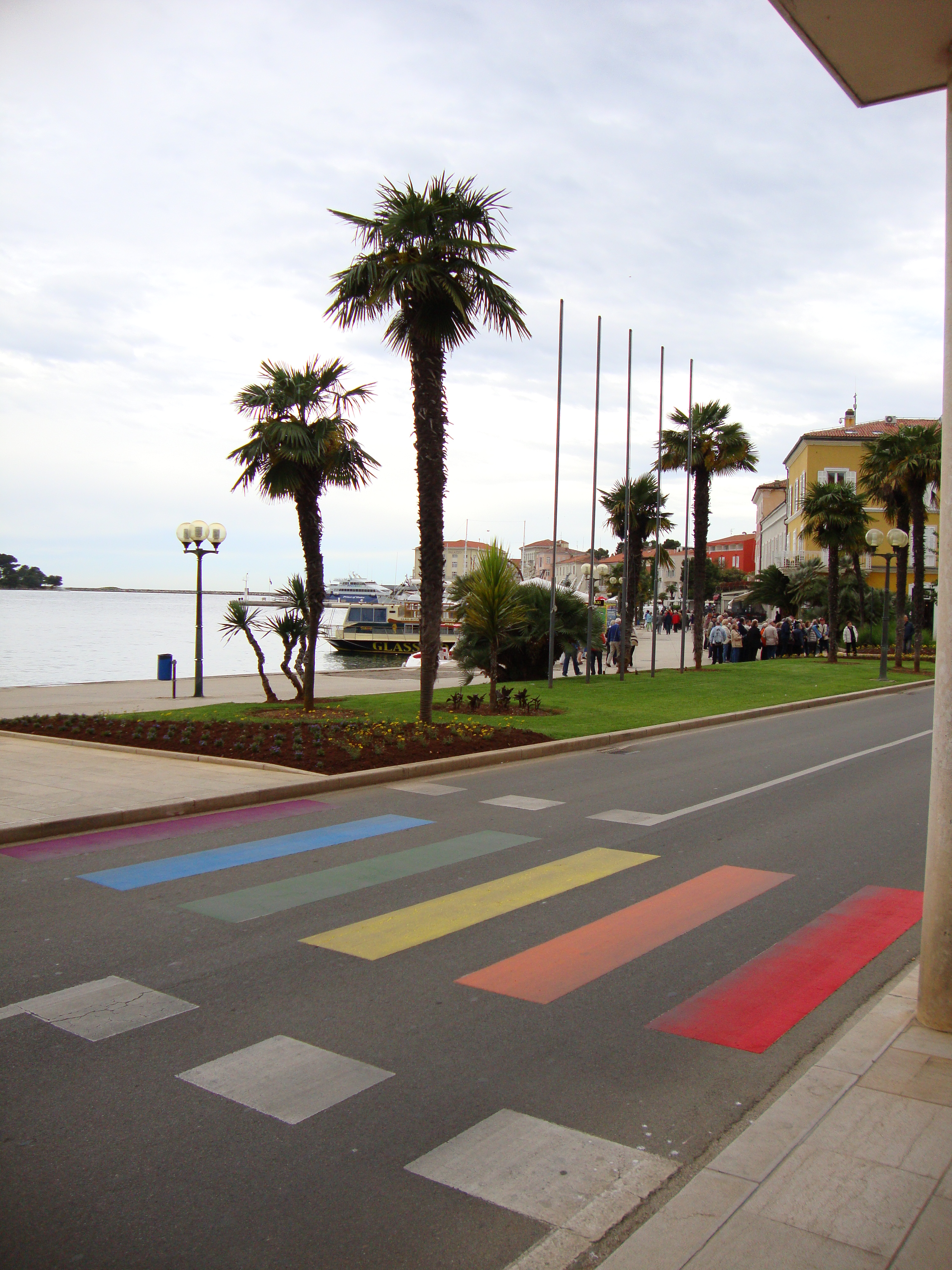
A rainbow-coloured pedestrian crossing in Poreč on the occasion of IDAHOT 2014

The former Croatian President, Ivo Josipović, has given strong support to full LGBT rights, along with several other popular celebrities and centre-left political parties such as the Social Democratic Party of Croatia (SDP), the Croatian People's Party-Liberal Democrats (HNS), the Croatian Social Liberal Party (HSLS), ORaH, and the Labour Party. After Josipović was elected, he met with LGBT associations several times. On 1 June 2012, he published a video message giving support to the 2012 Split Pride and the further expansion of LGBT rights. He also condemned the violence at the 2011 Split Pride, calling it unacceptable and arguing that the next Split Pride should not experience the same scenario. In October 2013 at a reception at the Presidential Palace he welcomed the newly appointed Finnish ambassador and his life partner to Croatia.

Vesna Pusić, a member of HNS, is very popular within the Croatian LGBT community. She has been active in improving LGBT rights while being a member of successive governments. A former member of the SDP, current president of ORaH and a former Minister for Environment and Nature Protection in the Kukuriku coalition Mirela Holy has also been a notable long-time supporter of LGBT rights, and has participated in every LGBT Pride event so far.

Other supporters of LGBT rights in Croatia include Sandra Benčić, Rade Šerbedžija, Igor Zidić, Slavenka Drakulić, Vinko Brešan, Severina Vučković, Nataša Janjić, Josipa Lisac, Nevena Rendeli, Šime Lučin, Ivo Banac, Furio Radin, Darinko Kosor, Iva Prpić, Đurđa Adlešič, Drago Pilsel, Lidija Bajuk, Mario Kovač, Nina Violić, former Prime Minister Ivica Račan's widow Dijana Pleština, Maja Vučić, Gordana Lukač-Koritnik, pop group E.N.I. etc.

Damir Hršak, a member of the Labour party, who has publicly spoken about his sexual orientation and has been involved in LGBT activism for years, is the first openly gay politician to become an official candidate for the first European Parliament elections in Croatia, held in April 2013. He had criticized the current coalition government for not doing enough for the LGBT community, and said that his party would not make concessions, and is in favour of same-sex marriage.

Conservatives such as Ruža Tomašić have also indicated that same-sex couples should have some legal rights. The Croatian President Kolinda Grabar-Kitarović while against same-sex marriage, did indicate her support for the Life Partnership Act praising it as a good compromise. She also included sexual minorities in her inaugural speech, and said she would support her son if he was gay. During the referendum, the conservative former Prime Minister, Jadranka Kosor, voted in favour of presenting the issue before the Constitutional Court, and against the proposed Constitutional change. This was a change from her previous position on homosexuality and same-sex marriage where she had been known for being against the expansion of LGBT rights, and subsequently voted "homophobe of the year" in 2010 by visitors of the website "Gay.hr" after stating that homosexuality is not natural, and that same-sex marriages should never be legal. She also supported the Life Partnership Act.

On 16 June 2011, 73 professors and associates of Zagreb Faculty of Law signed a statement initiated by the professor Mihajlo Dika, in which they expressed their full support for 2011 Zagreb Pride, and their support for the authorities in preventing and sanctioning behavior endangering equality and fundamental rights and freedoms of Croatian citizens effectively and responsibly. They also condemned hooligans that attacked the participants of the 2011 Split Pride.

In February 2019, a new left-wing and green political party formed by local green and leftist movements and initiatives called We Can! – Political Platform appeared on the political scene. The party has expressed support for full LGBT rights. In 2020 the party won seats in Sabor, and after the 2021 local elections in Zagreb they became the largest political party in the Zagreb Assembly, winning 23 seats in total. Their mayoral candidate, Tomislav Tomašević won a landslide victory on 31 May. He participated in Zagreb Pride in the past, but in 2021 for the first time as a mayor, which was also the first time a mayor of Zagreb attended the Pride.

In March 2024, the Social Democratic Party of Croatia (SDP) founded its LGBTQ wing, the SDP Queer Forum. It is the first party in the region to establish this type of organisation. The forum's goal is promotion of the rights of all gender and sexually non-normative persons, fight against violence and discrimination. The forum advocates for enabling same-sex adoption and blood donation for men who have sex with men. It joined Rainbow Rose, the LGBTQ wing of the Party of European Socialists.

=== Opponents of LGBT rights ===
| Campaign poster calling to vote 'For' "Every child needs mum and dad!" | Campaign poster calling to vote 'Against' "They think that single parents are unnatural environment. You don't want to be next. Vote against!" |

Results of the referendum by county

The largest conservative party in Croatia, the Croatian Democratic Union (HDZ), remains opposed to LGBT rights. HDZ MPs voted against the proposed law on unregistered cohabitations, and against the Life Partnership Act. Since Croatian independence, HDZ has managed to form a majority in the Sabor on its own or with coalition partners in 6 out of 8 Parliamentary elections (1992, 1995, 2003, 2007, 2015, 2016). The party has, nevertheless, enacted several laws that ban discrimination on the basis of sexual orientation and gender identity as part of the negotiation process prior to the accession of Croatia to the European Union. The Croatian Democratic Alliance of Slavonia and Baranja (HDSSB), a regionalist and right wing populist party formed in 2006 is also opposed to LGBT rights. During the Parliamentary debate on the Life Partnership Act, Dinko Burić, HDSSB MP stated his opposition to the law: "For us, being gay is not ok!" He also added that this is his party's official stand on LGBT rights. HDSSB MPs supported the 2013 referendum by having the word FOR on top of their laptops in Parliament. Contrary to that, the president of HDSSB, Dragan Vulin, expressed his support for equal rights for same-sex couples in everything except adoption during the 2016 parliamentary election campaign.

Ruža Tomašić, leader of the Croatian Conservative Party has expressed her opposition to same-sex marriage on the grounds that Croatia is a majority Catholic country, but at the same time expressed her support for same-sex couples to receive equal rights to married couples in everything except adoption. Her former deputy from the HSP Dr. Ante Starčević, Pero Kovačević, said that the 19th century Croatian politician Ante Starčević after whom the party has been named would not have opposed LGBT rights, and would have supported same-sex marriage. This was said in response to the youth-wing of the party organizing an anti-gay protest. The group later published an official letter expressing outrage to Kovačević's opposition to the protest.

The Roman Catholic Church in Croatia has also been an influential and vocal opponent to the extension of LGBT rights in the country. After the first LGBT Pride in Split in 2011 some Catholic clergy even attempted to explain and justify the violence that had occurred during the Pride march. Dr. Adalbert Rebić argued that injured marchers had "got what they were asking for". Meanwhile, Ante Mateljan, a professor in the Catholic Theology College, openly called for the lynching of LGBT marchers.

The Catholic Church has also engaged at a political level, notably in providing public and vocal support for the 2013 referendum to define marriage in Croatia (and thus effectively reinforcing the existing prohibition on marriage between two people of the same gender). It was actively involved in collecting signatures for the petition to force a constitutional change. Cardinal Josip Bozanić encouraged support for the proposed constitutional amendment in a letter read out in all churches where he singled out heterosexual marriage as being the only union capable of biologically producing children, and thus worthy to be recognised.

A conservative group "In the Name of the Family", formed in 2013, was the initiator of the 2013 referendum. The group opposes same-sex marriage, and any other form of recognition for same-sex unions. The most prominent member of the group, Željka Markić, opposed the Life Partnership Act claiming it was same-sex marriage under a different name, and thus a violation of the Constitution. She argued that the partner-guardianship institution proved most problematic under law. The Minister of Administration, Arsen Bauk, responded that the government would not be changing the law on this point, while giving a reminder that the Constitutional court had made clear that defining marriage as a union between a man and a woman in the Constitution must not have any negative effects on any future laws on recognising same-sex relationships (if not marriage).

== LGBT tourism ==
Croatia is a major tourist centre. Around 200,000 LGBT tourists visit Croatia annually. Destinations such as Dubrovnik, Hvar, Rab, Krk, Rovinj, Rijeka and Zagreb are advertised as gay-friendly.

The city of Rab has been a popular destination among gay tourists since the 1980s, and in 2011 it has officially become the first gay-friendly destination to advertise itself as such in Croatia. Director of the Rab Tourist Board Nedjeljko Mikelić stated: "Our slogan is – Happy island, and our message is happiness and holding hands, so feel free to hold hands whether you are a same-sex couple, a heterosexual couple, a mother and a daughter, a couple in love. Nothing negative will happen to you on this island, and you will be happy." In July 2008 a gay couple from South America married in Hvar. In June 2012, the Croatian Minister of Tourism Veljko Ostojić welcomed all gay tourists to Croatia, and supported Split Pride.

On the Gay European Tourism Association (GETA) website there are more than 50 gay and gay-friendly hotels and destinations in Croatia.

== Summary table ==
| Same-sex sexual activity legal | Yes (Since 1977) |
| Equal age of consent (15) | Yes (Since 1998) |
| Anti-discrimination laws in employment | Yes (Since 2003) |
| Anti-discrimination laws in the provision of goods and services | Yes (Since 2003) |
| Anti-discrimination laws in all other areas | Yes (Since 2003) |
| Anti-discrimination laws covering gender identity or expression in all areas | Yes (Since 2009) |
| Same-sex civil unions | Yes (Since 2014) |
| Same-sex marriage | No (Constitutional ban since 2013) |
| Recognition of same-sex couples | Yes (Since 2003) |
| Stepchild adoption by same-sex couples | Yes (Since 2014) |
| Joint adoption by same-sex couples | Yes (Since 2022) |
| Adoption by a single LGBT person | Yes |
| LGB people allowed to serve openly in the military | Yes |
| Transgender people allowed to serve openly in the military | |
| Right to change legal gender | Yes |
| Gender self-identification | No |
| Legal recognition of non-binary gender | No |
| Homosexuality declassified as an illness | Yes (Since 1973) |
| Access to IVF for lesbian couples | Yes (Since 2012) |
| Conversion therapy banned by law | No |
| Commercial surrogacy for gay male couples | No (Banned for all couples) |
| Commercial surrogacy for lesbians | No (Banned for all couples) |
| MSMs allowed to donate blood | No |

== See also ==
- Human rights in Croatia
- List of LGBTQ organizations in Croatia
- LGBTQ rights in Europe
- LGBTQ rights in the European Union
