= Franko Dota =

Croatian journalist, historian and LGBTQI activist

- Born: 1 September 1977 (age 49); Split, Croatia
- Education: University of Zagreb
- Years active: 2007-present

Franko Dota (born 1 September 1977) is a Croatian translator, journalist, historian and gay rights activist. Born in the city of Split and raised in Lovran, he finished his higher degree at the University of Zagreb in history and Italian language and literature, before pursuing a PhD in the history of homosexuality in Croatia and Yugoslavia in 2017. Since 2007, he is a member of the Croatian Zagreb Pride and is a co-founder of the legal counsel and representation service Rozi Megafon for LGBTIQ victims of violence and discrimination.

== Early years ==
Franko Dota was born in Split, Croatia and raised in Lovran Croatia in the region of Kvarner in Croatia. He finished university at the Philosophical University in Zagreb in the topics of history and Italian language and literature. In October 2017, he successfully defended his PhD on the topic Public and Political History of Male Homosexuality in Socialist Yugoslavia (1945-1989). This marked the first dissertation ever in the field of history of sexuality at a Croatian university.

He has been present in the field of Croatian LGBTIQ since 2007 through the organization "Povorki ponosa" (Pride Walks) and is one of the co-founders of Zagreb Pride. In 2010, along side Marko Jurčić started the Rozi Megafon service, which offers legal counsel, support and representation of LGBTIQ victims of violence and discrimination.

== 2025: Promotion of study on history of homosexuality in Yugoslavia ==
On 3 July 2021 he was guest on TV channel N1 where he spoke about the 20th Zagreb Pride. On 8 June 2022, Dota gave an interview with Lupiga in which he spoke that coming out is a lifelong process and urged the younger public to use support services when going through the process if need be. He added how in the long term he considered it more beneficial to live freely out of the closet and experience one's identity and lifestyle to the fullest.

He specializes in the field of homosexuality in Yugoslavia. In 2025, he appeared on several shows to discuss his newly released book Povijest homoseksualnosti u socijalističkoj Jugoslaviji (English: History of Homosexuality in Socialist Yugoslavia). On 10 October 2025, he appeared on N1 Hrvatska where he discussed how contemporary conservatives have the same discourse on homosexuals and sexuality as communists did. He also explained the connectedness between female reproductive rights and the rights of sexual minorities. He also described the direction of integrating queer minorities in the egalitarian reality of the socialist system in the 1970s and how there was difference between Croatia, Slovenia, Montenegro and Vojvodina as opposed to North Macedonia, Bosnia and Herzegovina, Kosovo and "Uža" Serbia with regards to decriminalization of same-sex acts and depathologization of homosexuality (which took place in the 1980s).

On 19 October 2025, he appeared on the VIDA TV Kontrapovijest show by Hrvoje Klasić podcast to discuss the topic and promote his book. He also brought to light the case of Josip Mardešić Viški, a 24 year-old Partisan who was shot on 7 March 1944 by the regime due to his homosexuality.

== See also ==
- List of LGBTQ rights activists
- LGBTQ rights in Croatia
