= Bajuk =

Bajuk is a surname. Notable people with the surname include:

- Andrej Bajuk (1943–2011), Slovenian politician and economist
- Lidija Bajuk (born 1965), Croatian singer-songwriter and poet
