= Zagreb Pride =

LGBT pride march in Zagreb, Croatia

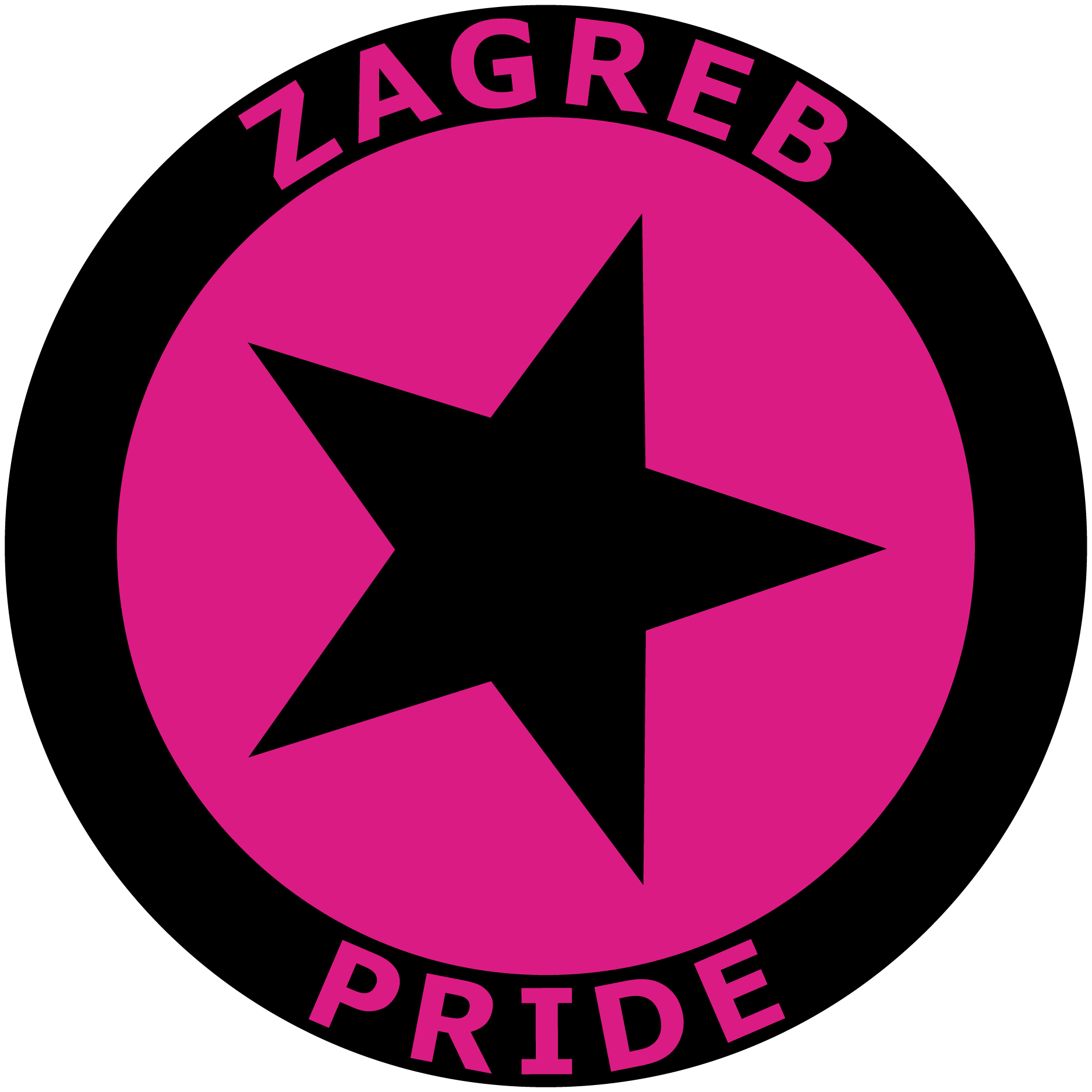
- Logo of Zagreb Pride
- Native name: Zagrebačka povorka ponosa
- English name: Zagreb Pride
- Date: Usually held every first or second Saturday of June
- Location: Zagreb
- Type: Pride march
- Cause: Fight for full equality of LGBTIQ* people of Croatia within society and the law
- Organized by: Used to be Iskorak and KONTRA intermittently, now Zagreb Pride

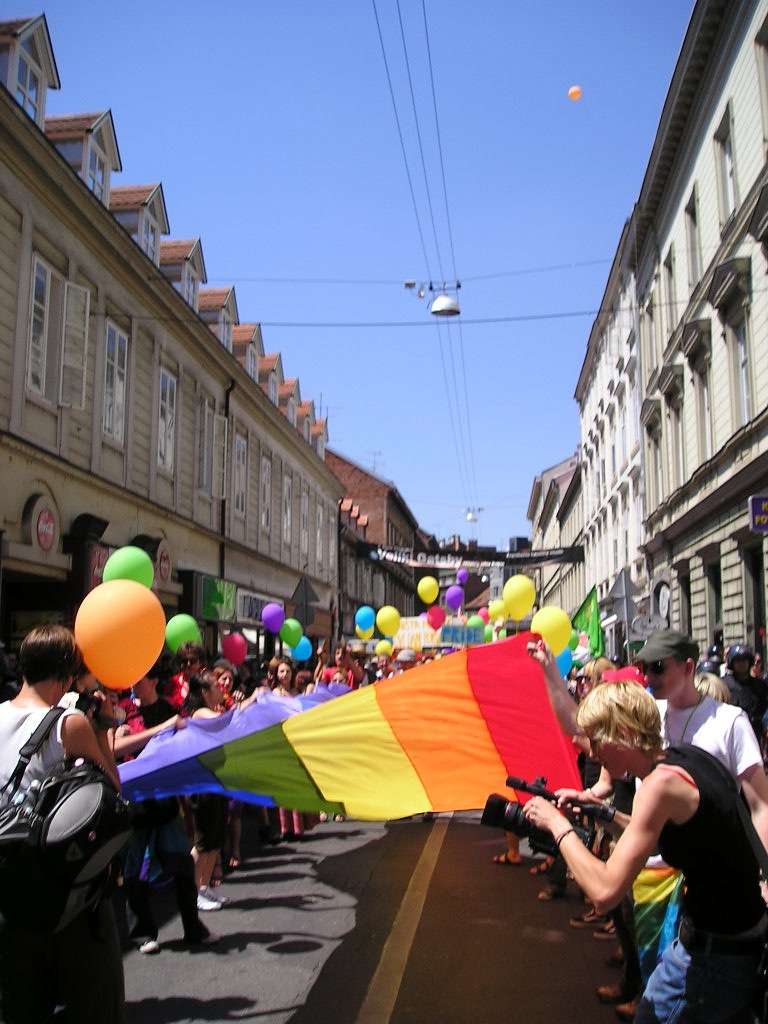
2007 Zagreb Pride

Zagreb Pride (Croatian: Zagrebačka povorka ponosa) is the annual LGBTIQ+ pride march in the city of Zagreb, Croatia, which first took place in 2002, as the first successful pride march in Southeast Europe. Zagreb Pride organizers said their work was inspired by the Stonewall Riots and the Gay Liberation Front. It identifies itself as an LGBTIQ+ march, in 2003, changed its name from Gay Pride Zagreb to Zagreb Pride. The Pride was organized by a volunteer-based, and grass-roots Organizing Committee that was formed each year. A new organization founded in 2008 as a non-governmental organization Zagreb Pride that also registered the use of the name as a brand. The organization is a member of InterPride, EPOA, IGLYO, ILGA-Europe and in 2010, together with Lesbian Organization LORI and Domino, it was the founding member of Croatian first national LGBT association, Center for LGBT Equality (Croatian: Centar za LGBT ravnopravnost). Pride receives funding from the City of Zagreb and a number of international human rights organizations and embassies.

The event usually consists of a Pride March through the city center, followed by a gathering at the Nikola Šubić Zrinski Square where speeches are given by LGBTIQ activists. Each year the organizers adopt a theme and a collection of principles and values called the "Pride platform", which is designed to be reflected in the march, speeches, and publicity for the event. Since 2015 the program of Zagreb Pride is held in Park Ribnjak instead of Zrinjevac.

Since 2011, Pride Week has been established, with various of daily political, activist and social events, all related to the Pride theme. During the Pride Week, Zagreb's legalized squat AKC Medika was turned into the "Pride House".

Zagreb Pride, Ljubljana Pride and Belgrade Pride are each other's "sister prides".

== Political impact ==
Since the first Pride held in Croatia LGBT rights and acceptance of LGBT persons have seen significant progress. In 2003, one year after the first LGBT pride in Croatia, then ruling coalition consisted of mostly center-left parties and managed to agree and passed a law on same-sex unions. The law granted same-sex partners who have cohabited for at least 3 years similar rights as those enjoyed by unmarried cohabiting opposite-sex partners in terms of inheritance and financial support. However, it excluded adoption rights or any other right included in the family code as this law was not part thereof, but rather a separate piece of legislation. Registering those relationships was not allowed nor did they include the right to make a joint declaration of taxes, property, health insurance, pensions etc. Despite this law being more symbolic rather than practical, it was considered as a milestone in the Croatian legal system as it was the first to recognize the existence of same-sex relationships.

On 11 May 2012, Prime Minister Zoran Milanović announced a further expansion of rights for same-sex relationships with the equivalent rights and responsibilities to those of marriage except for adoption. Sabor passed the Life Partnership Act on 15 July 2014, which replaced the law on same-sex relationships passed in 2003. This law made same-sex couples equal to married couples in everything except adoption. However, an institution similar to stepchild adoption called partner-guardian has been created.

Croatia also prohibits all discrimination against LGBT individuals through several laws:

- Penal Code (includes hate crime legislation and "racial and other discrimination")
- Gender Equality Law
- Criminal Procedure Law
- Law on Science and Higher Studies
- Media Law
- Electronic Media Law (anti-discrimination based on sexual orientation, gender identity and gender expression)
- Life Partnership Act
- Labour Code
- Sport Law
- Asylum Law
- The Law on volunteering (anti-discrimination based on sexual orientation, gender identity and gender expression)

On 1 January 2013, the new Penal Code was introduced with the recognition of hate crimes based on gender identity.

Political support for LGBT rights in Croatia is significant. At the time of the first Pride, coalition consisted of mostly center-left parties was in power, providing support for future expansion of rights. However, one member of this coalition was also the Croatian Peasant Party (HSS), which strongly opposes LGBT rights. Most of the members of the coalition initially proposed registered partnerships for same-sex couples, but HSS insisted for this to be dropped as a condition for their continued support of the coalition. Concessions had to be made and the parties agreed on unregistered cohabitation for same-sex couples.

In 2003, a parliamentary election was held, and the right-wing Croatian Democratic Union (HDZ) won the majority of seats. HDZ opposes LGBT rights, but they have enacted several laws that ban discrimination based on sexual orientation and gender identity as part of the negotiation process before joining the European Union. They remained in power until late 2011 when the centre-left Kukuriku coalition won the election.

Third Croatian President Ivo Josipović provides strong support for full LGBT rights, along with many other celebrities and center-left political parties such as Social Democratic Party (SDP), Croatian People's Party (HNS), Croatian Social Liberal Party (HSLS), the Green List, and the Workers Party. He was one of the most prominent supporters of LGBT rights even before he was elected president. Following his election, he has met with LGBT associations several times expressing support.

Vesna Pusić, a member of HNS, is very popular among Croatian LGBT community, and was voted the "Gay Friendly Person of the Decade" by the LGBT community. As a government member, she has been actively involved in improving LGBT rights. A member of SDP and former Minister of Environment and Nature Protection in the Kukuriku coalition, Mirela Holy, has been a notable supporter of LGBT rights for years. She has participated in every Croatian LGBT pride to date. Other supporters of LGBT rights in Croatia are Rade Šerbedžija, Drago Pilsel, Ivo Banac, Furio Radin, Darinko Kosor, Đurđa Adlešič, Vesna Teršelič, Lidija Bajuk, Mario Kovač, Nina Violić, former Prime Minister Ivica Račan's widow Dijana Pleština, pop group E.N.I., Severina Vučković, Vlatka Pokos, Luka Nižetić, Franka Batelić, Arsen Bauk, Peđa Grbin, Tomislav Tomašević, Boris Milošević etc. Hundreds of public figures have thus far expressed support for LGBT rights.

In 2012, Zagreb Pride formed an LGBT parents group whose representatives met President Ivo Josipović, and spoke at the 2012 pride march.

== History ==
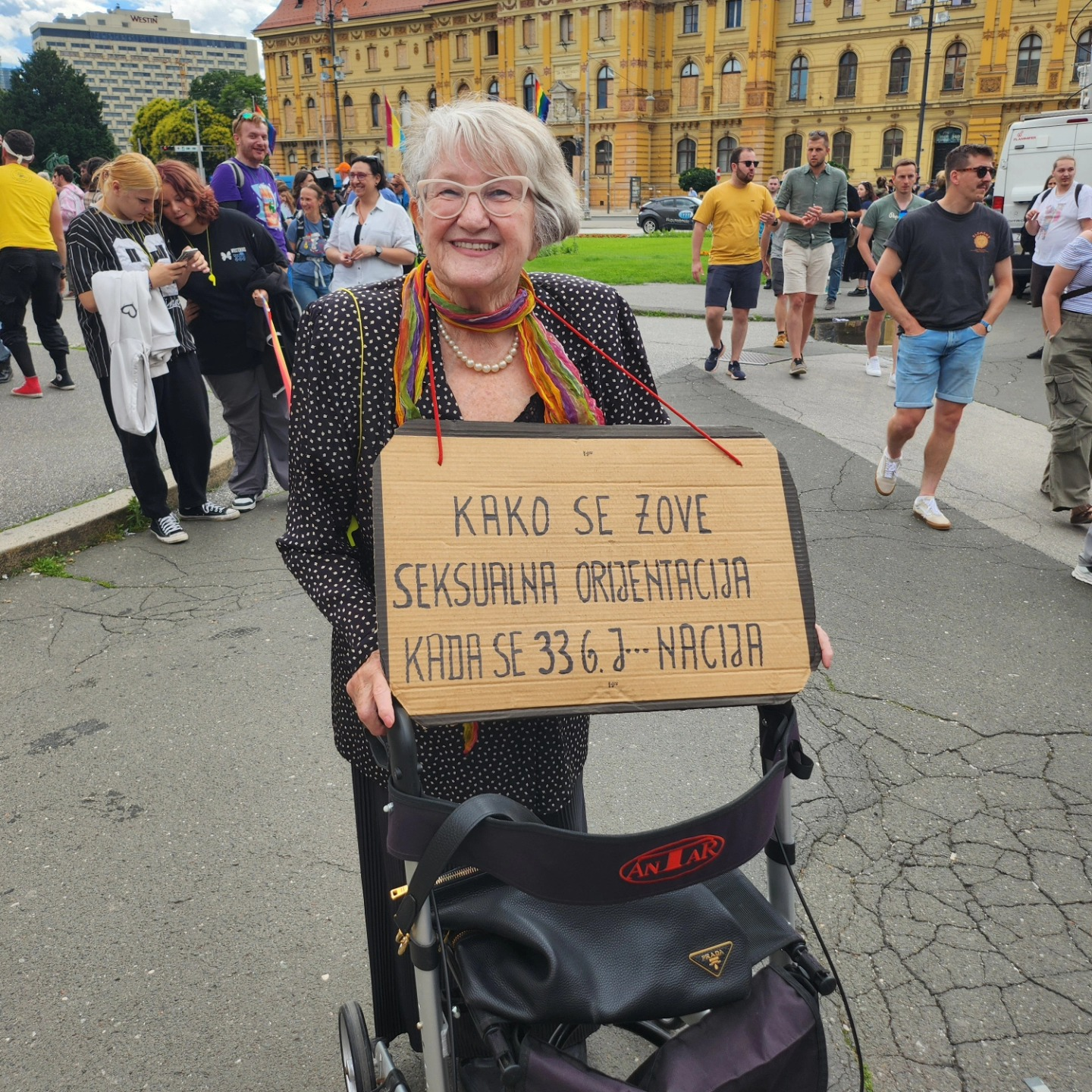
Zagreb Pride 2024 banner with an intersectional question: What is sexual orientation term used for nation being f___ed for 33 years?

=== 2002 ===
On 29 June 2002, the very first Pride march of sexual and gender minorities took place in Zagreb's park Zrinjevac. Gay Pride Zagreb 2002 was entitled "Iskorak KONTRA predrasuda" ('Coming out AGAINST prejudice'). Approximately 300 individuals participated, including some of the top state officials. The motto was Coming Out AGAINST prejudices (Iskorak KONTRA Predrasuda).

Sometime around 9:00, just before the gathering, unknown attackers beat up Croatian theatre director Mario Kovač, who was supposed to be Pride's master of ceremonies. As the gathering progressed, homophobic opponents to Gay Pride Zagreb rallied at the western side of Zrinjevac, yelling "Go to Serbia", "Kill the Serb", "Fags to concentration camps", "Heil Hitler", "Sieg Heil", "Die", and "We are Aryan", and then invoked the name of the first President of Croatia Franjo Tuđman. Some of them tried to jump over the iron fence put up at Zrinjevac, but were prevented from doing so. Throughout the gathering, the police used video cameras to record it. As the gathering was coming to an end, tear gas was thrown at the Pride crowd assembled at Zrinjevac.

Most citizens managed to leave the gathering peacefully, and security and police vehicles took the speakers to safety. However, following the gathering, approximately 20 citizens were beaten up in about ten incidents. Multimedia Institute's public space net.culture club MaMa was attacked, as it was co-organizer and host location with address listed on the poster (for pre-program and organizing work). According to Teodor Celakoski, manager of the Mama club, seven skinheads stormed into the club, receiving instructions on where to go via the mobile phone. Upon their arrival, they started to harass people, asking them who had gone to the Gay Pride. They randomly chose three people and beat them up. After the gathering, nine attackers attacked the guests of Močvara in the Tomić Street. Most commentators agree that had it not been for the police cordon, the gathering would have ended in an explosion of violence. The police brought in 27 disorderly persons (11 as a preventive measure, 10 for disorderly conduct, and 6 in order to establish their identity).

Several skinheads who threatened them and cursed them, which led to another police intervention, met the organizers of the event, who after the gathering attempted to take the props to a van that was waiting for them in Đorđić Street. The organizers left the gathering with the help of the police.

=== 2003 ===
The second Zagreb Pride was held on June 28, 2003, organized by the lesbian group Kontra and the Center for the Rights of Sexual and Gender Minorities Iskorak. The motto was "Proud again" (Opet ponosno) and was dedicated to the introduction of anti-discrimination provisions into Croatian laws and amendments to the Family Code.

=== 2004 ===
The third Zagreb Pride was held on June 19, 2004, organized by the lesbian group Kontra under the slogan Vive la différence (French for "long live diversity"). The themes of the march were discrimination against the transgender population and homophobic statements by some Catholic priests. For the first time, the march was supported by people or groups from pop culture, for example Nina Violić, Dunja Knebl, E.N.I. and Lollobrigida.

=== 2005 ===
The fourth Zagreb Pride in 2005 was organized by a feminist group Epikriza, and it promoted a registered partnership law proposed by two Sabor members, one of Social Democratic Party and one liberal independent member. It was the first Pride not organized by its Pride Committee. The motto of the march was Proud Together (Ponosne/i zajedno).

At the beginning of June, most prominent LGBTIQ+ group Iskorak (name stands for 'coming out' and 'step forward' in Croatian), which has been that year's logistic support, announced that its activists would not organize Pride before the summer break, also stating that the Pride march was irritating citizens of Zagreb by blocking the public transport for a few minutes, and that Pride was at that time useless to the LGBTIQ community in Croatia. They proposed that a concert with "big names" outside of city center would be more appropriate, but it was never organized. Instead, Iskorak's Pride project was replaced with the Coming Out project.

With just a few weeks of preparations and about US$1,500, an informal and until that day unknown feminist group Epikriza organized a small march in July with about 100 people and without any program. The group got media support and advice from former Pride organizers not involved with Iskorak, and logistical and financial support by Kontra and the Center for Peace Studies.

=== 2006 ===
Zagreb Pride held in 2006 was the first international pride, motto of pride was, written in 13 languages, To Live Freely (Živjeti slobodno). It had a regional character and was organized in support of those participants coming from countries where the sociopolitical climate is not ripe for the organization of Pride events and where such a manifestation is expressly forbidden by the authorities. From June 22 to June 26, the international event took place and brought together representatives from 13 countries. From those participating only Poland, Slovenia, Croatia, Romania and Latvia have organized Prides until that year, with Bosnia and Herzegovina, Macedonia, Bulgaria, Albania, Slovakia and Lithuania never having Prides before. However, this has changed, and some of them have successfully organized Prides since then. The attempt to organize such an event in Belgrade, Serbia in 2001, ended in a bloody showdown between the police and the counter-protesters, with the participants heavily beaten up.

=== 2007 ===
The 6th Zagreb Pride was held on July 7, 2007 under the motto, written in masculine and feminine, All to the Pride! (Svi na Pride! Sve na Pride!). The theme of the march was the right of sexual minorities to be visible in society and to express their identity without fear of discrimination and abuse. The Pride route first started at the then Marshal Tito Square, while the central program took place at Petar Preradović Square. About twenty participants of the procession were attacked after its end, and the police arrested several people.

=== 2008 ===
The 7th Zagreb Pride was held on June 28, 2008, the theme was strength of unity. The motto of the march read: You Have the Courage! (Imaš hrabrosti!). For the first time, the Zagreb Pride association provided logistical support to the autonomous organizing committee. The procession passed without incident, while individual attacks occurred after the end of the manifestation.

=== 2009 ===
The 8th Zagreb Pride was held on June 13, 2009 under the motto Participate! (Sudjeluj!). During the march, a protest by opponents of Zagreb Pride took place. After the march, one person was seriously injured, and the police detained several people.

=== 2010 ===
The 9th Zagreb Pride was held on June 19, 2010 under the motto Croatia Can Swallow That! (Hrvatska to može progutati!). The theme was freedom of sexual expression and diversity of sexual practices. For the first time, the president of the state received the organizing committee of Zagreb Pride. Along with the event itself, a counter-protest was held, and several attacks on the participants were recorded.

=== 2011 ===
The 10th Zagreb Pride is considered to be a turning point in Pride's history. As a result of chaos at Split Pride, this Pride was emphatically supported by the media and politicians. The media led the campaign to support the LGBT community, calling everyone to "march in the upcoming Zagreb Pride". Four days before the Zagreb Pride march the organizers met with President Ivo Josipović. A week after the Split Pride, the 10th Zagreb Pride march took place. Around 4,000 people marched while many of the bystanders resoundingly supported the LGBT community. It was the biggest Pride rally in Croatia at the time and took place with no violence thanks to efficient police protection. Motto of pride was The Future is Ours! (Budućnost je naša!).

=== 2012 ===
The 11th Zagreb Pride followed much the same pattern. It attracted even more participants than the one the previous year and transpired free of violence. It was reported that the number of police officers securing the Pride was lower than during previous years' events. The organizers did not hide their satisfaction with this Pride, saying that the difference and the progress between the first Pride in 2002 and this one was magnificent. The motto of the march was We have Family! A Millennium of Croatian Dreaming (Imamo obitelj, tisućljetni hrvatski san).

=== 2013 ===
The 12th Zagreb Pride took place on 15 June 2013, attracting a record-breaking 15,000 participants. It was supported by many celebrities, NGOs, and politicians, including Vesna Pusić, Mirela Holy and Prime Minister Zoran Milanović's wife Sanja Musić Milanović. The motto of the march was "This is a country for all of us", and it was a direct reaction to the initiative introduced by the right-wing organization called U ime obitelji (In the Name of the Family), that would limit the term "marriage" to heterosexual communities by introducing a constitutional amendment through a referendum. The initiative was backed by the Catholic Church and other right-wing organizations and political parties. Many of those who were against it decided to support Zagreb Pride, making it almost four times bigger than the one in 2012. The Government officially opposed the possible referendum, and announced it will send the referendum question to the Constitutional Court for a review. The Pride went without a single incident, with many bystanders supporting it. Mile Kekin, a frontman of the Croatian punk rock band Hladno pivo was named a "homofriend" of the year. Motto of pride was This is a country for all of us (Ovo je zemlja za sve nas).

=== 2014 ===
The 13th Zagreb Pride was held on June 14, 2014 under the motto On the right side of the history (Na pravoj strani povijesti). On the right side of history. Procession. About two thousand people passed the traditional route from the Square of Victims of Fascism, through the Square of Ban Jelačić to Zrinjevac, where the final rally was held.

=== 2015 ===
The 14th Zagreb Pride was held on June 13, 2015 under the motto Louder and braver: Anti-fascism without compromise! (Glasnije i hrabrije-Antifašizam bez kompromisa). It was a response to the steady rise of right-wing extremism in politics and society. That year, the route of the Pride was changed, and since then the final gathering and program part of the Pride is held in Park Ribnjak instead of Zrinjevac.

=== 2016 ===
The fifteenth Pride Parade was held on June 11, 2016, under the motto Croatia Has Not Yet Fallen! (Još Hrvatska ni propala). The proclamation highlighted the struggle to defend elected rights and freedoms in the context of constant right-wing attacks on non-profit media, reproductive rights and the rights of LGBTIQ+ persons. As part of the Pride Week, the documentary film Pride for all of us (Prajd za sve nas) was premiered. This film, produced by Zagreb Pride, tells a story of fifteen years of the Pride March in Zagreb, the organizers of the March and the social context in which the March was created and developed. About seven thousand people took part in the Procession itself, and it followed an unchanged route.

=== 2017 ===
The 16th Zagreb Pride was held on June 10, 2017 under the mottoFree life begins with pride. (Slobodan život počinje ponosom) and recorded the highest turnout since 2013. In the proclamation of the procession, it was pointed out that freedom depends on social, economic and other factors and in the circumstances of assured existence and stable material conditions. The Pride March was preceded for the first time by Pride Month (instead of Pride Week), which began on the International Day Against Homophobia and Transphobia (IDAHOT) on May 17 as a cultural and political manifestation of the LGBTIQ+ community.

=== 2018 ===
The 17th Zagreb Pride was held on June 9, 2018 under the slogan Long live gender. (Da nam živi, živi rod). It gathered over ten thousand participants. The theme of the procession was gender identity, gender expression and the right of each person to self-determination. Many young people participated in the procession.

=== 2019 ===
The 18th Zagreb Pride was held on June 8, 2019 with the motto 18 Proud Years (Osamnaest ponosnih godina).

=== 2020 ===
The 19th Zagreb Pride was held on September 19, 2020, instead of June, due to anti-epidemic measures related to COVID-19. The motto of the march was Freedom inside and outside of 4 walls (Sloboda unutar i izvan četiri zida). The procession started for the first time from Markovo trg, then went down from Stross to Mesnička and Ilica, and ended at Draškovićeva at Ribnjak, in cooperation with Art Park and Animafest.

=== 2021 ===
The 20th Zagreb Pride took place on July 3, 2021, attracting around 2.500 participants. It was the first pride that was attended by Zagreb's mayor. The motto of the march was Pride forever! (Prajd zauvijek!); it was held as a celebration of the annual Pride marches since 2002. The event was marked by homophobic violence, for the first time in ten years: multiple queer people were harmed, including a young lesbian woman who was attacked by four men, a young gay man who was attacked by multiple homophobes who burned his rainbow flag, and two young lesbian women who were verbally attacked and spat on.

=== 2022 ===
On June 4, 2022, Zagreb Pride was held for the 21st time, without incidents and with strong presence of politicians and media.

=== 2023 ===
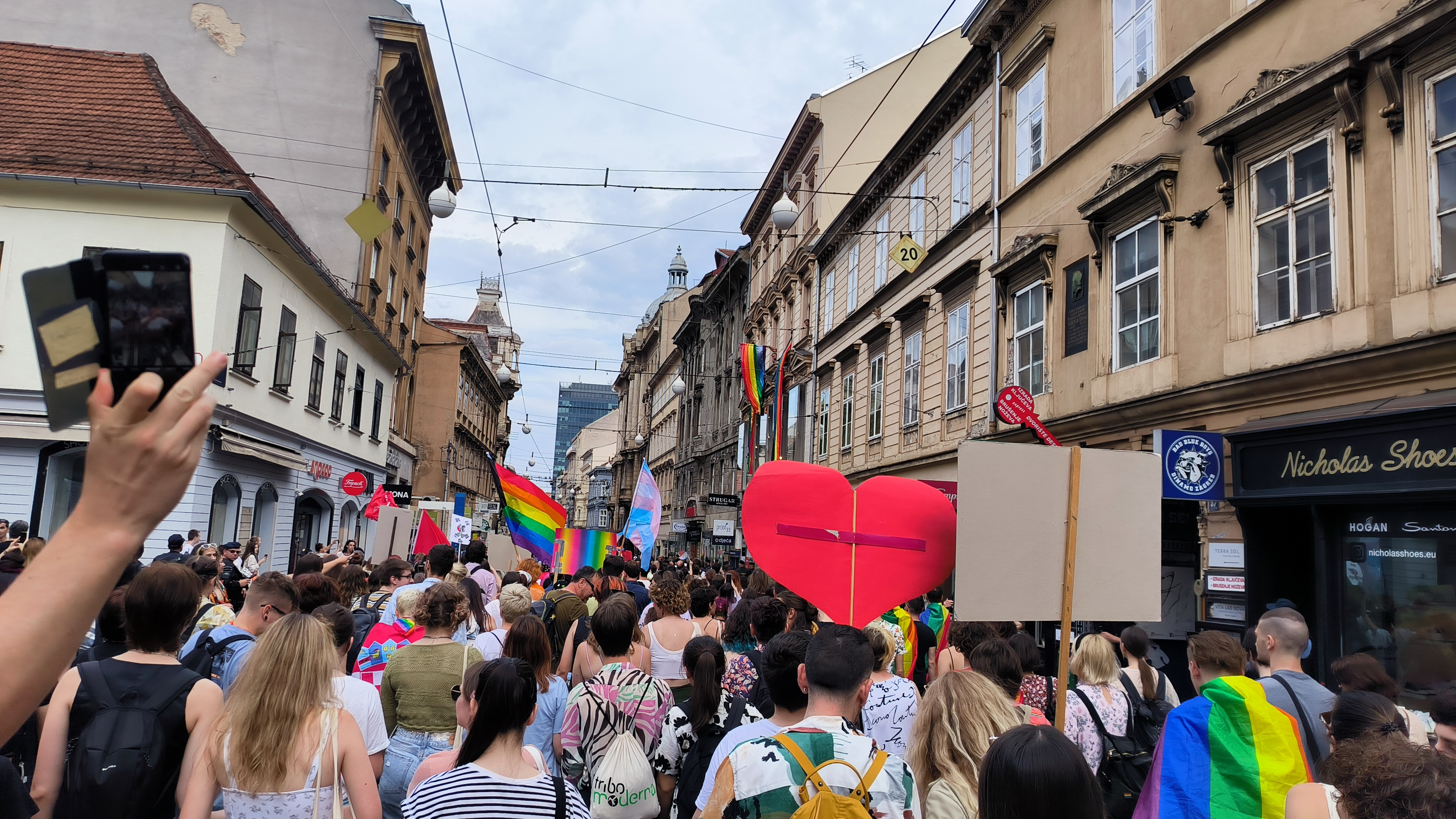
Zagreb Pride 2023 participants walk Ilica street

On June 10, 2023, Zagreb Pride was co-organized, after few years, in joint effort and coordination of several NGOs (including key trans-rights organizations) under the moto Together for trans rights and including official delegation and support from the City of Zagreb.

== Zagreb Pride History ==
Year	Dates	Pride name	Motto	Theme	Estimated attendance
2002	June 29	Gay Pride Zagreb 2002	Coming Out AGAINST prejudices (Iskorak KONTRA Predrasuda)	Coming out	350
2003	June 28	Zagreb Pride 2003	Proud Again (Opet ponosno)	Anti-discrimination legislation	300
2004	June 19	LGBTIQ Pride March Zagreb Pride 2004	Vive la difference (Živjela različitost)	Catholic church homophobia and transgender rights	300
2005	July 10	Zg Pride 2005	Proud Together (Ponosne/i zajedno)	Registered Partnership Act	100
2006	June 24	LGBTIQ Pride March Internacionala Pride 2006, Zagreb	To Live Freely (Written in 13 languages) (Živjeti slobodno)	Freedom of assembly	250
2007	July 7	LGBTIQ Pride March Zagreb Pride 2007	All to the Pride! (Written in masculine and feminine) (Svi na Pride! Sve na Pride!)	The visibility of LGBTIQ persons and the symbolic “takeover” of public spaces	400
2008	June 28	LGBTIQ Pride March Zagreb Pride 2008	You Have the Courage! (Imaš hrabrosti!)	Power of togetherness	600
2009	June 13	LGBTIQ Pride March Zagreb Pride 2009 for the Open City - Stonewall 40	Participate! (Sudjeluj!)	Participation for building a Zagreb LGBTIQ community	800
2010	June 19	LGBTIQ Pride March Zagreb Pride 2010	Croatia Can Swallow That (Hrvatska to može progutati)	Freedom of sexual expression and variety of sexual practices	1.200
2011	June 18	LGBTIQ Pride March Zagreb Pride 2011	The Future is Ours! (Budućnost je naša!)	First 10 prides and future that they bring	3.800
2012	June 16	LGBTIQ Pride March Zagreb Pride 2012	We have Family! A Millennium of Croatian Dreaming (Imamo obitelj, tisućljetni hrvatski san)	LGBTIQ families	4.000
2013	June 15	LGBTIQ and family Pride March Zagreb Pride 2013	This is a country for all of us (Ovo je zemlja za sve nas)	Protest march against the referendum initiative for the constitutional amendment banning same-sex marriage	15.000
2014	June 14	LGBTIQ and family Pride March Zagreb Pride 2014	On the right side of the history (Na pravoj strani povijesti)	Widening the space for struggle: solidarity with social groups whose rights are endangered with the rise of radical and clerical right-wing agenda	5.000
2015	June 13	LGBTIQ and family Pride March Zagreb Pride 2015	Louder and braver: Anti-fascism without compromise! (Glasnije i hrabrije-Antifašizam bez kompromisa)	Anti-fascism. Fight against discrimination of minorities, exclusivity, chauvinism, single-mindedness and radicalization of society through the glorification of the fascist Ustasha movement and the right wing ideology.	5.000
2016	June 11	LGBTIQ and family Pride March Zagreb Pride 2016	Croatia Has Not Yet Fallen! (Još Hrvatska ni propala)	Defence of acquired LGBT rights and personal and civil liberties of all people in Croatia	7.000
2017	June 10	LGBTIQ and family Pride March Zagreb Pride 2017	Free life begins with pride. (Slobodan život počinje ponosom)	Freedom of choice, equality, personal safety, social justice, solidarity	10.000
2018	June 9	LGBTIQ and family Pride March Zagreb Pride 2018	Long live gender. (Da nam živi, živi rod)	Gender equality and gender diversity	10.000
2019	June 8	LGBTIQ and family Pride March Zagreb Pride 2019	18 Proud Years (Osamnaest ponosnih godina)	Full equality	7.000 - 10.000
2020	September 19	LGBTIQ and family Pride March Zagreb Pride 2020	Freedom inside and outside of 4 walls (Sloboda unutar i izvan četiri zida)	Marriage equality (pride held during COVID-19 pandemic)	500 - 1.500
2021	July 3	LGBTIQ and family Pride March Zagreb Pride 2021	Pride forever! (Prajd zauvijek!)	Celebration of 20 uniterupted pride marches in Croatia	2.500
2022	June 4	LGBTIQ and family Pride March Zagreb Pride 2022	Give us our four walls! (Dajte nam naša četiri zida!)	The demand of City of Zagreb to give LGBTIQ* community a space where they can "feel safe, free, creative and cheerful every day of the year".	10.000-12.000

== Other LGBT Prides in Croatia ==
Split was the second city in Croatia to have its LGBT Pride with first one taking place in 2011, Osijek the third with its pride taking place on 6 September 2014, Karlovac fourth with its first pride taking place on 5 June 2023, and Pula fifth with its first pride taking place on 22 June 2024.

== See also ==
- LGBT pride
- LGBT pride parade
- Europride
- LGBT rights in Croatia
- Recognition of same-sex unions in Croatia
