= 2013 Croatian constitutional referendum =

- 1 December 2013
- Are you in favor of the constitution of the Republic of Croatia being amended with a provision stating that marriage is matrimony between a woman and a man?

Results
Choice	Votes	%
Yes	946,433	66.28%
No	481,534	33.72%
Valid votes	1,427,967	99.43%
Invalid or blank votes	8,196	0.57%
Total votes	1,436,163	100.00%
Registered voters/turnout	3,791,000	37.88%

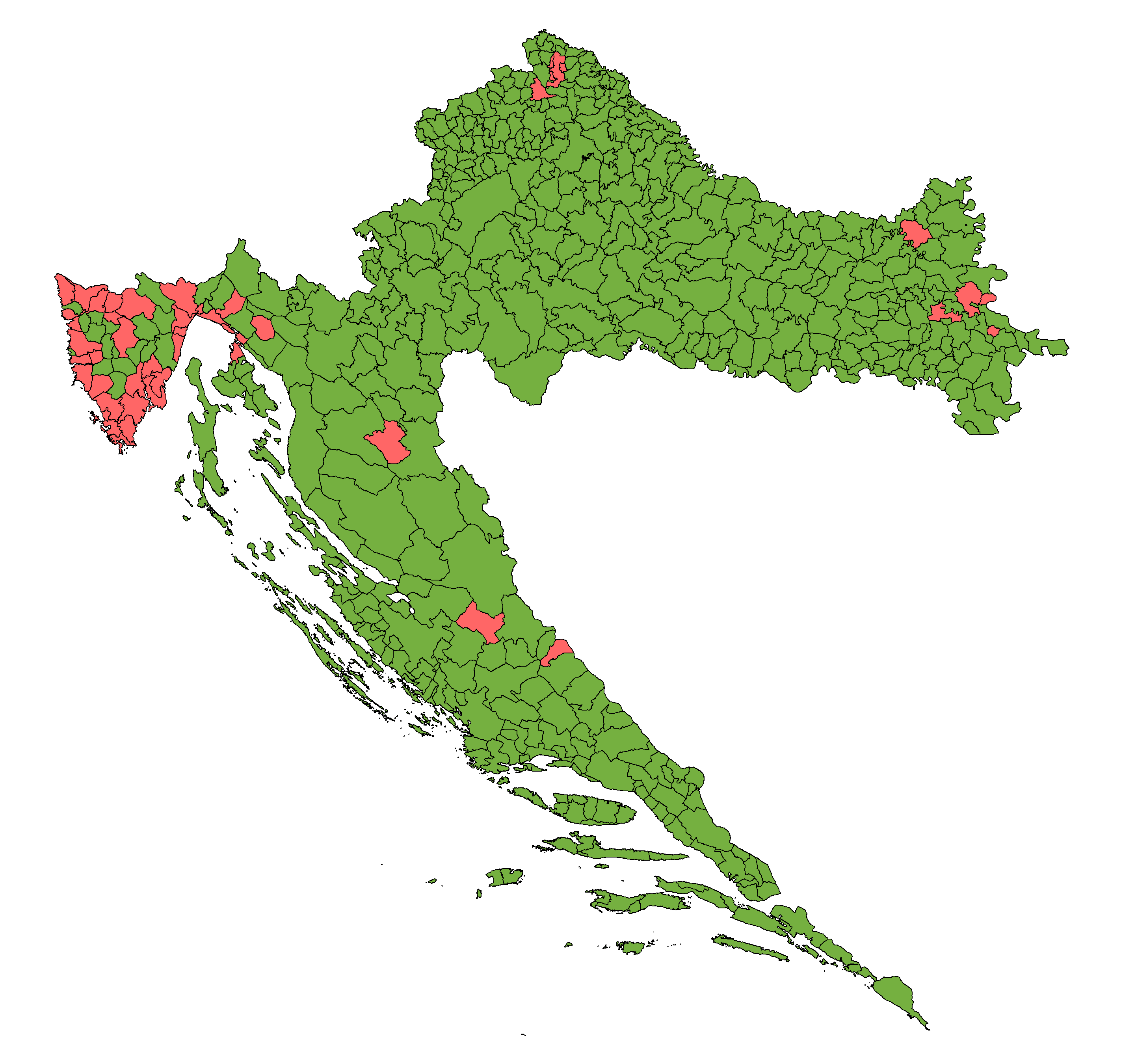
For	Against
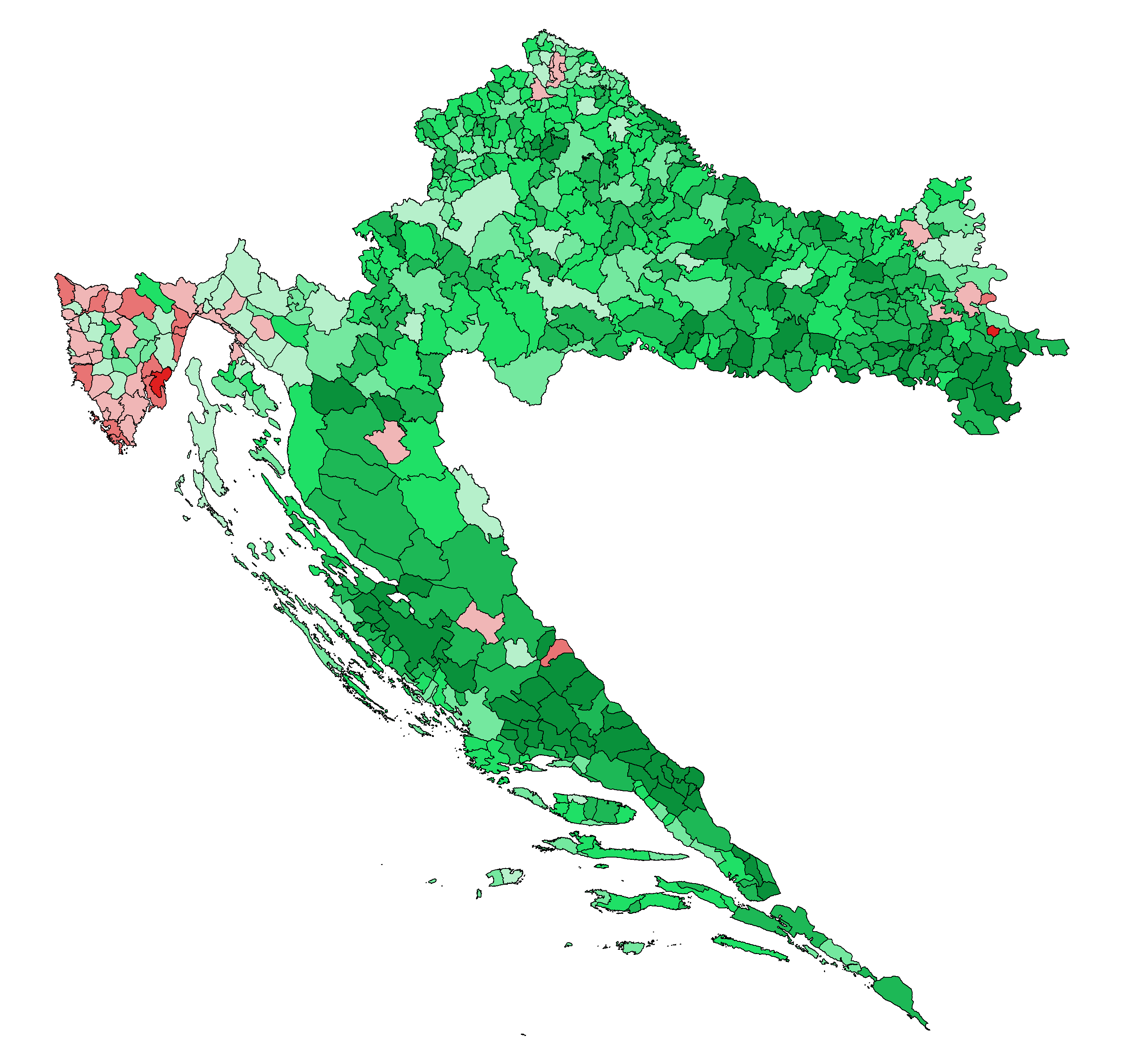
For: >90% 80–90% 70–80% 60–70% 50–60%	Against: 50–60% 60-70% 70–80% 80–90% >90%
Results by county

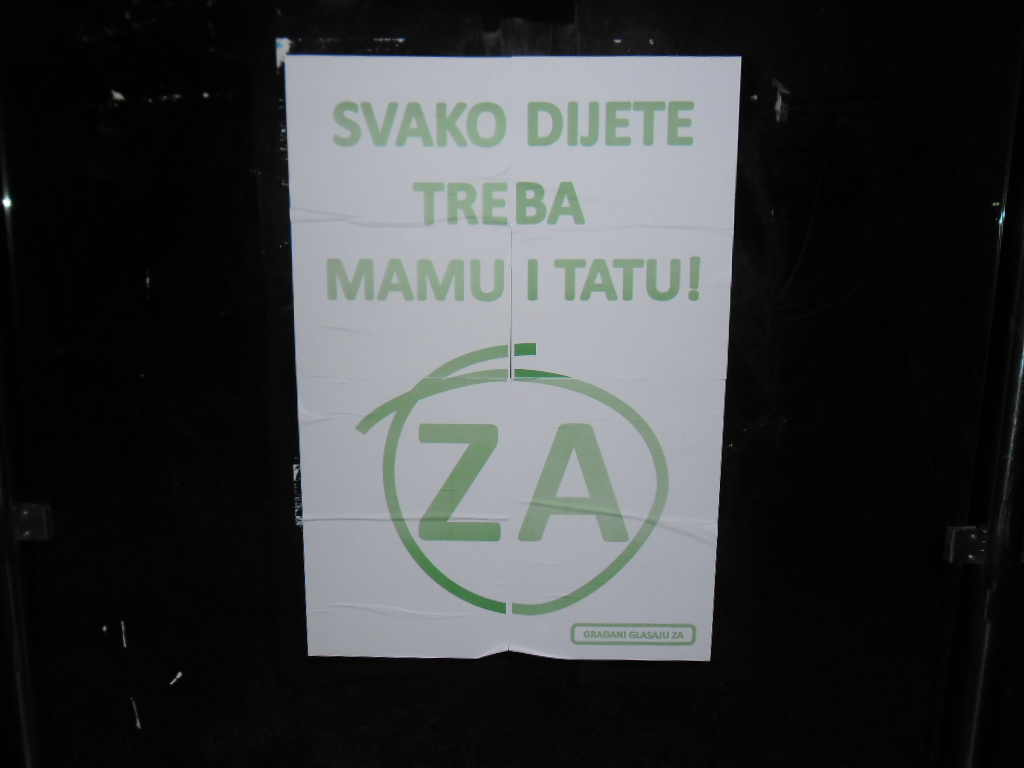
Campaign poster calling to vote 'For'. Translation: Every child needs a mom and a dad!

Campaign poster calling to vote 'Against'. Translation: I vote against!

A constitutional referendum was held in Croatia on 1 December 2013. The proposed amendment to the constitution would define marriage as being a union between a man and a woman, which would create a constitutional prohibition against same-sex marriage. 38% of eligible voters voted. After processing all of the ballots, the State Election Commission announced that 66% voted yes, 34% no, while and 1% of ballots were disregarded as invalid.

The referendum was called after a conservative organization U ime obitelji ('On Behalf of the Family') gathered more than 700,000 signatures in May 2013 demanding a referendum on the subject. The initiative was supported by conservative political parties, the Catholic Church as well as by several other faith groups. The ruling left-wing coalition opposed the amendment along with numerous human rights organizations.

== Political background ==
A petition in favor of the change was organized by a Catholic citizens' group 'On Behalf of the Family' (Croatian: U ime obitelji) and collected over 700,000 signatures by May 2013. The initiative was a reaction to the government's proposal to legalize same-sex partnership. The referendum was approved following a vote in the Sabor on 8 November in which 104 of the 151 MPs voted in favor of holding a referendum.

The group Citizens Voting Against was formed from 88 civil society organizations (led by GONG, Center for Peace Studies and Zagreb Pride), supported by numerous public persons, film actors and actresses, academics, activists and politicians, including media such as Novi list and Jutarnji list and musicians, such as Severina, Dubioza kolektiv, Let 3, Hladno pivo, TBF and others.

The Vote Against campaign claimed that the public faces of the initiative Željka Markić, Krešimir Planinić, Krešimir Miletić, Ladislav Ilčić, as well as members of their families, were simultaneously leaders of the referendum effort and candidates of the right wing political party HRAST. The Vote Against and the broader coalition of civil society organizations, Platform 112, claimed that the bank account listed on 'On behalf of the Family' web site does not belong to the initiative but an ad hoc registered association Građani odlučuju ('The Citizens Decide') which was founded by the vice-president of HRAST Krešimir Miletić.

Željka Markić was furthermore criticized by opponents for allegedly being a member of the controversial Catholic organization Opus Dei.

=== Constitutionality of the referendum question ===
Voters were asked the question:

Jeste li za to da se u Ustav Republike Hrvatske unese odredba po kojoj je brak životna zajednica žene i muškarca?
Are you in favor of the constitution of the Republic of Croatia being amended with a provision stating that marriage is matrimony between a woman and a man?

After the initiative gathered enough signatures to hold a referendum, it was widely speculated that the referendum would still not be held. The political willingness in the Sabor to call a referendum was uncertain given that a left-wing coalition which opposed the proposed amendment held a majority of the seats.

However, in a session held on 8 November, the Sabor voted to call a national referendum, with 104 votes in favour, 13 against and five abstentions. A former Prime Minister and an independent MP Jadranka Kosor proposed that the request for the review of constitutionality of the referendum be submitted to the Constitutional Court. However, the two largest parties, the HDZ and SDP, did not embrace the proposal and it was rejected by 75 votes against and 39 in favour. The only political party of the ruling coalition that supported the constitutional review was the HNS.

After a two-day session, on 14 November the Constitutional Court of Croatia announced that there is no reason to over-rule the parliamentary vote on the referendum. The judges emphasized that the constitutionality of the referendum itself was not considered, because they believed that the Sabor had expressed its legal willingness to deem the referendum question compliant with the Constitution. However, they further emphasized that any possible amendment to the Constitution that defined marriage as a union of man and woman could not affect further development of the legal framework of the institution of extramarital and same-sex unions. The Constitutional Court did not rule on the constitutionality of the referendum because it was not officially requested to do so by the Croatian Parliament.

The judges were divided in opinion on whether the Constitutional Court should review the constitutionality of the referendum. Several of them pointed out that the Constitutional Court must give a statement on what the constitutional definition of marriage means for the position of LGBTQ minorities in Croatia. Others explained that the Constitutional Court did not need to respond to citizen proposals, because only the Sabor had the right to request a review of the constitutionality of the referendum question, but which it has refused to do when making the decision to call a referendum.

== Campaign ==
The Prime Minister Zoran Milanović told HRT that he would vote against the proposal. President Ivo Josipović called the referendum unnecessary, without practical political consequences regardless of the outcome, and a waste of taxpayer money. The president furthermore commented that marriage has already been defined in Croatian law as a union of man and woman, but that the referendum question has a strong psychological effect with an underlying discriminatory message.

If successful, this will only strengthen the message that we are not willing to accept diversity, that we want to stop throughout the democratic world a clear process of equalization of rights of all people, regardless of their different personal characteristics, in particular their sexual orientation

— Ivo Josipović

Tomislav Karamarko, leader of the conservative Croatian Democratic Union said he would vote in favor. Four other parties in the Parliament also supported the referendum; in total 104 of 151 members of the Croatian Parliament supported it.

Jutarnji list, one of the country's two largest newspapers, announced it would openly endorse the campaign against the amendment. A similar statement was later made by Novi list.

The Croatian Bishops' Conference called for Croatian Catholics to vote in favour of the constitutional amendment. Representatives from the Croatian Bishops' Conference, the Serbian Orthodox Church, the Macedonian Orthodox Church, the Reformed Christian (Calvinist) Church, the Baptist Union of Croatia, the Evangelical Pentecostal Church, the Bet Israel Jewish Community and the Mesihat of Croatia issued a joint statement in support of the referendum on 12 November. However, the Croatian Evangelical Lutheran Church and the Jewish Community of Zagreb opposed the proposed amendment. The Rabbinical Center of Europe has written a statement in support of the referendum and the civil initiative 'On behalf of the family', saying they were "very disturbed at reports that some have compared this pro-marriage initiative with the Nazi regime and the ideology of fascism".

Cardinal Josip Bozanić encouraged support for the amendment in a letter that was read in churches where he singled out heterosexual marriage as being the only kind of union that is capable of biologically producing children.

If marriage is a union between a woman and a man, then it is not the same as other types of unions. The Church does not promote any kind of discrimination when it backs that definition of marriage. On the contrary, we can say that the danger exists today of marriage itself being discriminated against, by presenting it as something that it cannot be. The Church wants to preserve marriage and wants the definition of it be clearly spelled out, so that the institution of marriage and the institution of family are preserved for future generations. The Church is therefore not against anyone, it is open for dialogue with everyone, but wants to make it clear that some things can not be made equal. We respect everyone's opinions, but we want the institution of marriage and family, which is imperiled by societal developments today, to be guarded for the future of the Croatian people and a good in all of us.

— Josip Bozanić

Bozanić repeatedly called the issue of marriage naming a serious issue for country's future and reiterated the viewpoint that it is not Church's intent to discriminate against anybody, but only to "preserve what we already have". He remarked that the referendum was an opportunity for Christians to practically manifest their fate by voting yes, by respecting God's intent and serving the Truth. He echoed his previous statements that marriage and family are not a private affair of the individual which they can shape as they see fit, but are of wider social significance and must not be experimented upon.

=== Media portrayal ===
The initiative and their goals were generally unfavorably reported by the mainstream Croatian media.

On the day of the referendum the initiative decided to forbid access to their headquarters to the journalists belonging to a group of selected media whom the initiative accused of bias, unprofessionalism and plagiarism. Among these were the Croatian Radiotelevision, the public broadcasting company, the most visited Croatian Internet portals Index.hr, Net.hr and T-portal, as well as all of the publications by Europapress Holding and Novi list. The initiative required of all of the journalists to submit their cell phone numbers, their home addresses, e-mail addresses as well as the name and e-mail address of their editors. This was strongly denounced by the Croatian Journalists' Association who invited all of the media to boycott the coverage of initiative on the referendum day, and emphasized the potential for the abuse of private information.

In the last few weeks we have seen a number of anonymous vulgar letters sent to respected journalists in which they are being insulted and threatened by unknown persons, and obvious semi-fascists, simply because of their position on the issue. We believe that this kind of discrimination of journalists announced by the initiative "On behalf of the family" is hitherto unprecedented in Croatia.

— Zdenko Duka, president of the Croatian Journalists' Association

All of the major Croatia media have responded to the call and in solidarity with the banned journalists have completely boycotted the coverage of the initiative.

== Opinion polls ==
A poll conducted in June 2013 revealed that 55.3% of Croats support the changes, while 31.1% said they were opposed.

Another poll from November revealed that 54.3% of respondents will vote for the proposal and 33.6% against. 12.1% of respondents said they were not sure. The same poll revealed that 85.7% of HDZ voters and 39.5% of SDP voters support the proposed amendment.

A poll published by HRT two days before the vote showed that 59% of respondents would vote for the proposal, 31% against and 10% did not answer.

== Results ==
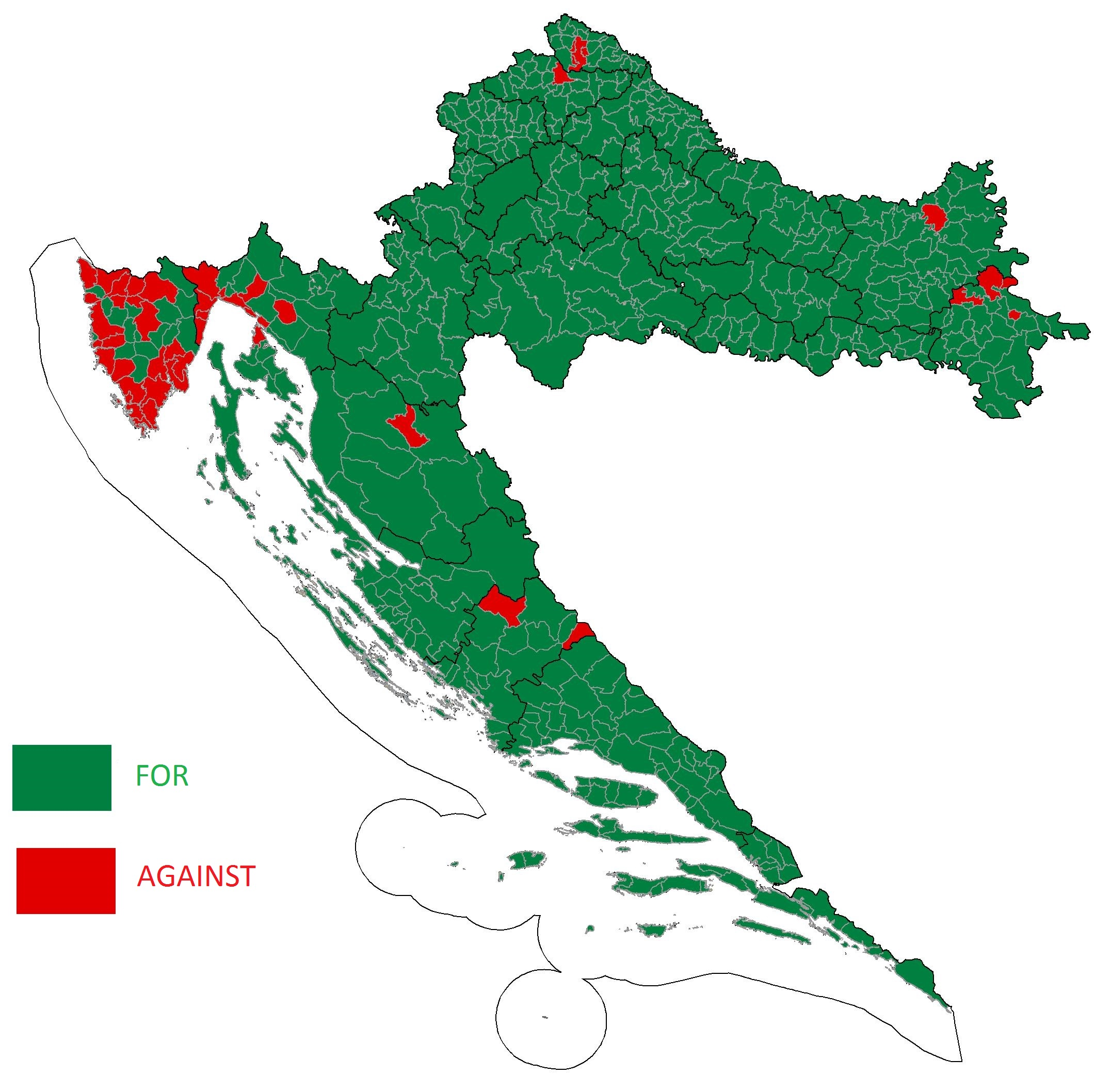
Results per municipality

After processing all of the ballots, the State Election Commission announced that 65.87% voted yes, 33.51% no and 0.57% of ballots were disregarded as invalid. 37.9% of eligible voters have voted.

Pula, Rijeka, Varaždin and Čakovec were the only large cities, and Istria county and Primorje-Gorski Kotar County were the only counties where the majority of the voters voted no. The counties most supportive of changes were in the Croatian South: Šibenik-Knin, Split-Dalmatia, Dubrovnik-Neretva, and Brod-Posavina. This relative polarization of results between Croatian North and South has been interpreted by sociologists as closely connected to economic indicators as well as the extent to which the regions were affected by the war in the 1990s. In the capital Zagreb, 43.5% of voters voted no, which was interpreted as the capital being an amalgam of "largely incompatible tendencies".

Statistical analysis by electoral units has also indicated a strong correlation to political choices, with regions whose citizens voted for right-wing parties generally voting in favor of the referendum, while regions who voted for the left-wing coalition were largely against the referendum - albeit with many exceptions.

Beyond the municipalities in Istria, Primorje-Gorski Kotar, Varaždin, and Međimurje counties, the referendum initiative faced rejection exclusively within specific municipalities where the Serbs of Croatia constituted a majority. These municipalities included Negoslavci, Borovo, Trpinja, Markušica, Jagodnjak, Vrhovine, Ervenik, and Civljane. Despite a low turnout in these areas, the outcome was significantly influenced by the so-called Serbian Cyrillic Referendum initiative, which aimed to curtail the official use of minority languages in Croatia. Notably, this second initiative was later deemed unconstitutional.

Choice	Votes	%
For	946,433	66.28
Against	481,534	33.72
Total	1,427,967	100.00
Valid votes	1,427,967	99.43
Invalid/blank votes	8,196	0.57
Total votes	1,436,163	100.00
Registered voters/turnout	3,787,017	37.92

=== By county ===
County	Electorate	Turnout	%	For	%	Against	%	Invalid	%
Bjelovar-Bilogora	101,943	32,102	31.48%	22,539	70.21%	9,377	29.21%	183	0.57%
Brod-Posavina	141,318	46,880	33.17%	37,409	79.80%	9,183	19.59%	274	0.58%
Dubrovnik-Neretva	108,560	44,461	40.96%	34,286	77.11%	9,860	22.18%	309	0.70%
Istria	188,845	59,483	31.50%	24,427	41.07%	34,634	58.23%	402	0.68%
Karlovac	117,383	41,658	35.49%	28,633	68.73%	12,733	30.57%	286	0.69%
Koprivnica-Križevci	95,272	30,944	32.48%	21,232	68.61%	9,552	30.87%	160	0.52%
Krapina-Zagorje	109,529	33,129	30.25%	23,754	71.70%	9,147	27.61%	225	0.68%
Lika-Senj	47,645	12,005	25.20%	9,544	79.50%	2,379	19.82%	82	0.68%
Međimurje	95,996	29,657	30.89%	16,138	54.42%	13,329	44.94%	184	0.62%
Osijek-Baranja	263,073	89,991	34.21%	64,078	71.20%	25,437	28.27%	440	0.49%
Požega-Slavonia	68,364	23,879	34.93%	18,828	78.85%	4,886	20.46%	165	0.69%
Primorje-Gorski Kotar	268,981	95,735	35.59%	44,178	46.15%	51,028	53.30%	502	0.52%
Sisak-Moslavina	155,929	46,749	29.98%	32,046	68.55%	14,413	30.83%	282	0.60%
Split-Dalmatia	405,274	176,712	43.60%	137,281	77.69%	38,343	21.70%	1,015	0.57%
Šibenik-Knin	106,405	35,360	33.23%	26,216	74.14%	8,915	25.21%	219	0.62%
Varaždin	146,011	50,226	34.40%	30,885	61.49%	18,985	37.80%	337	0.67%
Virovitica-Podravina	73,296	23,337	31.84%	17,380	74.47%	5,806	24.88%	148	0.63%
Vukovar-Srijem	160,278	49,670	30.99%	40,128	80.79%	9,226	18.57%	301	0.61%
Zadar	165,572	55,922	33.78%	42,342	75.72%	13,169	23.59%	408	0.73%
Zagreb County	271,178	107,814	39.76%	75,274	69.82%	31,927	29.61%	564	0.52%
City of Zagreb	686,646	337,639	49.17%	188,757	55.90%	146,859	43.50%	1,661	0.49%
Voting abroad	-	13,482	-	11,078	82.17%	2,346	17.40%	49	0.36%
TOTAL	3,791,000	1,436,835	37.90%	946,433	65.87%	481,534	33.51%	8,196	0.57%
Source: State Election Committee

== Reactions ==
=== Negative reactions ===
The Prime Minister Zoran Milanović rejected accusations by civic initiatives that the government was complicit in calling the referendum. Milanović pointed out that the referendum was allowed by the constitution, that it is in no way related to the government, and no way does it change the existing definition of marriage according to Croatian laws. He further announced the upcoming enactment of the Law on Partnership, which will enable same-sex persons to form a lifetime partnership union. Such a union will share the same rights as that of marriage proper, apart from the fact that gay couples will not be able to adopt children, though they will be allowed to have custody of them.

Vesna Pusić, the First Deputy Prime Minister, also rejected accusations on government's responsibility, commenting that the referendum is result of an omission, when the threshold of 50 percent voter turnout was abolished to pass the 2012 EU membership referendum. Pusić contended that the threshold had protected certain groups from discrimination by a minority, but care was not taken to specifically exempt human, civil and minority rights from being the subject of referendum questions.

Hannes Swoboda, the President of the European Socialists, said that he "was deeply disappointed because he saw Croatia as an open and advanced society, and not as a country which prohibits happiness and equal rights".

=== Positive reactions ===
Hungary's ruling Christian Democratic People's Party (KDNP) welcomed the results, which cheered the approval of partnership based on "the order of nature" and the affirmation of marriage "in the Christian sense". According to the KDNP, it is the victory of the "European Christian values".

The Rabbinical Centre of Europe issued a statement that it was disturbed by comparisons between the initiative and the Nazi regime and totalitarian fascism, and that such statements were inappropriate and insulting to the memory of millions of their victims.

Croatian bishop Vlado Košić described the government official's opposition to the referendum as shocking, unacceptable and undemocratic, emphasizing that Croats are Catholic people, cherishing traditions by which they have lived for centuries. He accused the government of atheizing the population, being eager to erase their traditional values, and has called for their resignation.

== See also ==
- Recognition of same-sex unions in Croatia
- LGBT rights in Croatia
