= Split Pride =

LGBT pride march in Split, Croatia

Split Pride info
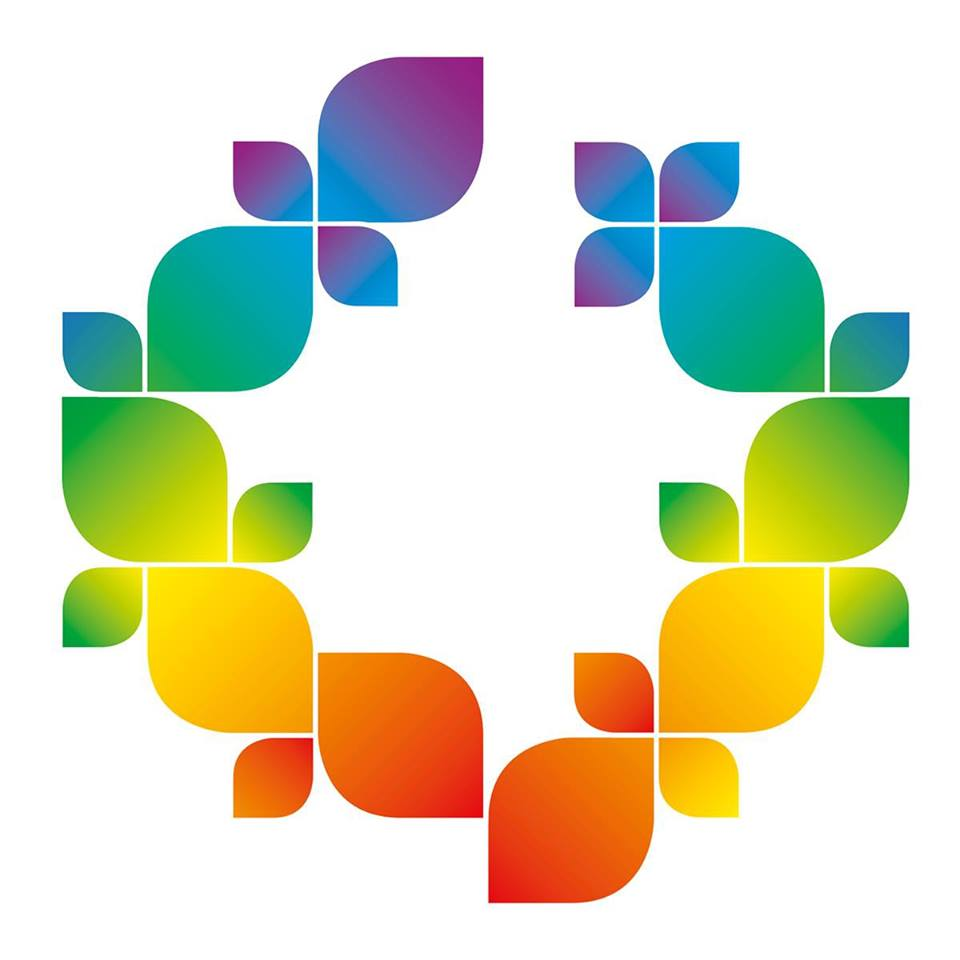
- Date: Every first Saturday of June
- Venue: Đardin park
- Location: Split
- Type: Pride event
- Theme: Full equality!
- Patron: City of Split
- Organised by: Rišpet - LGBT NGO Split

Split Pride is the LGBT pride march in the Croatian city of Split. Split was the second city in Croatia after Zagreb to get its LGBT pride, with the first taking place on the 11 June 2011.

== History ==
=== 2011 ===
The first Split Pride took place on the 11th of June 2011, and was organised by three NGOS; two LGBT organisations Kontra and Iskorak, and a feminist organisation 'Dominoes'. Split is the second largest city in Croatia, and the reasons behind this pride parade were the increasing demands and needs of the LGBT community. There were concerns about the public reaction as Split is considered to be a conservative city, and there was never a doubt that this would be a major step for the Croatian LGBT movement. Around 300 participants marched through the streets of the city. The police were accused of not doing enough to protect the participants, and violence broke out with around 10 000 anti-gay protesters throwing rocks, tin cans, tomatoes, tear gas and glass bottles at the LGBT activists. Some of the activists and some reporters were slightly injured in the riot. Marie Cornelissen, a member of the Parliament of Europe, condemned the violent protesters. The activists were led to safety, and several hundred anti-gay protesters were arrested, so the pride had to be cancelled.

Soon after, Split Pride media led the campaign to support the LGBT community, calling everyone to "march in the upcoming Zagreb Pride". Four days before the Zagreb Pride march, organizers met with President Ivo Josipović. About a week after the Split Pride took place, the 10th Zagreb Pride march took place. Around 4000 people marched while many of the bystanders loudly supported the LGBT community. It was the biggest Pride rally in Croatia at the time and took place without violence thanks to the efficient police protection.

Slogan for the first Split Pride was Croatian: Različite obitelji, jednaka prava meaning "Different families, same rights".

=== 2012 ===
The second Split Pride took place on 9 June 2012 and it was more successful than the one previous year. Around 700 participants marched, with some of them being from foreign countries such as Slovenia, Bosnia and Herzegovina, Montenegro, Serbia, the Netherlands, Australia, Germany and the US. This pride enjoyed major support from the Croatian media, celebrities, and politicians. On 1 June 2012 President Ivo Josipović has published a video message giving support for 2012 Split Pride and further expansion of LGBT rights. He has also condemned violence at 2011 Split Pride, saying that it was unacceptable and that the next Split Pride should not experience same scenario.

Five ministers from the government participated; Minister of Foreign and European Affairs Vesna Pusić, Minister of Administration Arsen Bauk, Minister of Construction and Physical Planning Ivan Vrdoljak, Minister of the Interior Ranko Ostojić, and Minister of War Veterans Predrag Matić. Other notable participants include Mladen Badovinac who is a member of famous Croatian band TBF, Predrag Matvejević, Rajko Grlić, Nenad Puhovski, Damir Urban, Zlatko Gall, Jurica Pavičić, Viktor Ivančić, Ante Tomić, Boris Dežulović etc. Following a chaos of previous year police made sure that there is no violence at this pride. 911 policemen were recruited, alongside a helicopter and two Water cannons. Many bystanders showed support for the pride, while opponents were unable to approach the participants. Live stream of the Pride was broadcast by Nova TV on their website.

At the same time as Split Pride took place, over 300 citizens of the third largest Croatian city Rijeka marched in support for the Split Pride and LGBT rights.

Slogan for the second Split Pride was Croatian: Jednake/-i pred zakonom! meaning "Equality before the law".

=== 2013 ===
The third Split Pride took place on 8 June 2013. Over 500 participants marched the streets of Split. Two ministers from the government participated; Minister of Foreign and European Affairs Vesna Pusić, Minister of Administration Arsen Bauk, along with some celebrities who participated the year before. This pride was significant as it was the first time in Croatia that a mayor of the city where the pride took place participated. Ivo Baldasar, a member of the ruling SDP, has attained the office one day before the pride. He supported full equality of the same-sex relationships before the law, and confirmed that the city council will help to open the first LGBT centre in the city. The number of policemen and security was lower than previous years, and this pride, to everybody's satisfaction, took place without a single incident. Many bystanders and tourists applauded and supported the pride.

Slogan for the third Split Pride was Croatian: Potpuna ravnopravnost! meaning "Full equality".

Split Pride History
Year	Dates	Pride name	Motto	Theme	Estimated attendance
2011	June 11	Split Pride 2011	Different families, same rights (Različite obitelji, jednaka prava)	LGBTIQ families	300
2012	June 9	Split Pride 2012	Equal before the law (Jednake/-i pred zakonom!)	Life Partnership Act	700
2013	June 8	Split Pride 2013	Full equality (Potpuna ravnopravnost!)	Inclusion of same-sex families in the Family law	300
2014	June 7	Split Pride 2014	Full equality (Potpuna ravnopravnost!)	Identical to previous year's theme	200
2015	June 6	Split Pride 2015	Let's come out to safe Split ("Izađimo u siguran Split")	Prevention of violence on the streets of the city	200
2016	June 4	Split Pride 2016	This is my business ("To je i moja stvar")	Prevention of violence on the streets of the city	200
2017	June 24	Split Pride 2017	Our colorful story ("Naša šarena štorija")	Enlightenment of citizens about the problems that LGBTIQ people encounter in their everyday lives	200

== The Church ==
The Roman Catholic Church in Croatia showed extreme and virulent homophobia, at times by promulgating violence against LGBT individuals. This was done, among other, by two lecturers at Roman Catholic seminaries and colleges, one Dr. Adalbert Rebić, who explains the violence as: "they got what they were asking for"., as well as Ante Mateljan, professor of the Catholic Theology College, who openly called for lynching LGBT marchers.

== Other LGBT prides in Croatia ==
Zagreb was the first city in Croatia to have its LGBT pride. It took place in 2002 and has become an annual event. On 30 June 2014 it was officially announced that the fourth biggest city in Croatia Osijek will have its first pride held on 6 September 2014.

Osijek held its first Osijek Pride on 6 September 2014, and is the third city in Croatia to get its LGBT pride, after Zagreb (2002) and Split (2011).
