= Mario Kovač (artist) =

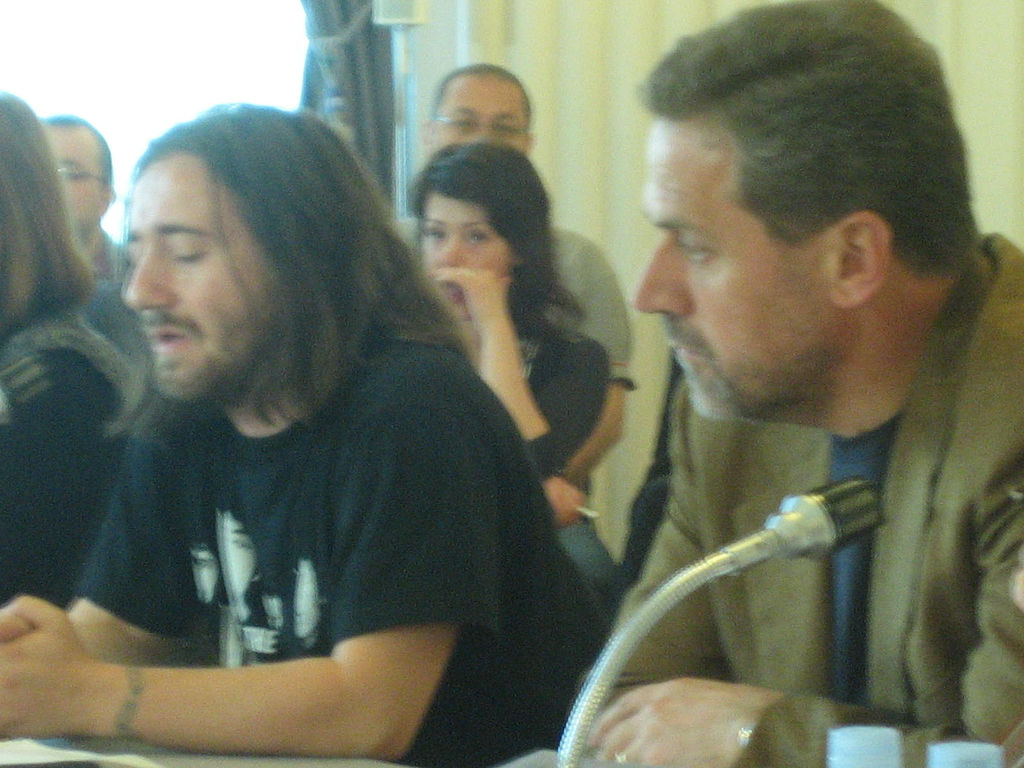
- Mario Kovač (left) and Zagreb mayor Milan Bandić in 2005
- Born: 25 October 1975 (age 49); Zagreb, SR Croatia, SFR Yugoslavia
- Occupation(s): Film director, theatre director

Mario Kovač (born 25 October 1975) is a prominent Croatian theatre and movie director, but also known as a multi-talented entertainer, TV program maker, musician and DJ, as well as activist for numerous causes on the left and green political spectrum.

== Early life ==
He was a member of Zagreb Youths Theatre school of acting from 1984 to 1996, and during that period he took part in over 50 professional and amateur projects, mainly as actor. He also played in many co-production foreign movies.

In 1995, he formed Schmrtz Teatar as an independent theatre group of young people interested in theatre, modern primitivism, alternative lifestyles and subcultural activities as well as in recycling of the old ideas about modernity and political influence of theatre. In less than five years they have produced over 120 plays, performances, shows, concerts, happenings, installations or actions. In 2000 they drastically reduced their membership (down to nine people) and changed their name into Nova Grupa, but their ideology of civil politics and independent "do it yourself" lifestyle stays the same. This group is very well known in the circuit of student festivals and has performed on many of those across the world (most of Europe, Venezuela, Canada, Iran, Tunisia, and elsewhere).

== Theater work ==
As a part of ATTACKs (Autonoumos Factory of Culture) performing arts team he founded FAKI (Front Alternativnog Kazališnog Ispada – Front of Alternative Theatre Outburst) with intention to promote, distribute and, generally, help independent theatre groups, mostly those who deal with street, student, low budget or alternative theatre. He was also one of the founders of K.R.A.D.U. (Kazališna Revija Akademije Dramskih Umjetnosti – Theatre Review of Academy for Drama Arts) and NGO TEST! -'Teatar Studentima' (Test! Theatar to the Students) both highly respected annual festivals in their fields.

A special aspect of his theatre involvement is work with people with disabilities, where he was key person in He has directed many plays with them and even won some awards at major festivals.

He also sings and plays (synth & theremin) in several musical bands, most notably in cabaret punk band Zvonko & Gradski Ured za Kulturu, avant/post noise band Tena Novak, experimental audio/visual project Dada Jihad. and art rock band Radost!.

== Activism ==
Mario Kovač is a member of numerous grass-root movements in Zagreb and Croatia, often stepping up as both public persona and director-performer, taking risks and exposing himself. He was a victim of hate crime in first Zagreb Pride even before he had a chance to get to the stage.

He took part in Pravo na Grad actions, as well as those initiated by Zagreb is OURS (Croatian: Zagreb je NAŠ!).

In 2020 he is joining Croatian left-green coalition We can! (Croatia) (Croatian: Možemo!) as the lead candidate of the list for Diaspora (through a performance action again).
