= Dunja Knebl =

- Born: 1946 (age 78–79); Zagreb, SFR Yugoslavia
- Genres: Acoustic; Folk Ethnic
- Occupation(s): Singer, translator
- Instrument(s): Vocals; Guitar
- Years active: 1993–present

Dunja Knebl (born 1946, Zagreb) is an acoustic folk and ethno music singer/performer and translator from Croatia.

Knebl was born in Zagreb, SFR Yugoslavia and lived in Skopje, Belgrade, Karlovac, but has also lived in Washington, Moscow and Jakarta. After completing her studies of English and Russian she spent most of her life working as a translator and language teacher, in her free time she sang folk songs to her friends.

She began performing professionally in 1993, and released her first solo album in 1994, an MC with 12 songs collected by Florijan Andrašec, one of the people she mentions as having a great influence on her music.

In 1997 she was nominated for the music award Porin, the Croatian equivalent of a Grammy, in the Best singer category. As of 2010 she released eleven albums and appeared on five other compilations.

The majority of the songs she sings are from Croatia (especially from the region Međimurje), but also from the USA, Macedonia and Russia. She is quoted as saying that her greatest achievement is the inclusion of her album Iz globline srca in the London-based A Rough Guide to World Music where she is recommended as an introduction to ethno-music from Croatia.

Additionally, she translated several Croatian cook-books into English, and the biographical monodrama Why I became a singer at the age of 47 or the fear of cloning was performed by the singer over two dozen times since 1997.

Knebl is most noted for her crystal-clear voice and very simple music arrangements, often only with improvised instruments or even without any. The songs she sings are slow, mellow and often sad and melancholic. Most of all she likes to record songs she has never heard.

Recent collaboration with Roko Margeta for 'Svilarica Svilu Prede' with songs from Slavonia was featured on Transglobal World Music Chart for January 2021.

Album Songbook Songs was in top 20 of Balkan World Music Chart 2021, and reviewed by Marija Vitas of World Music Association of Serbia as: '... impressive album, with each song approached differently, with a lot of care and sense for detail. In the same time, the whole concept is crystal clear, and exceptionally coherent as a whole.'

== Discography ==
1. Čuješ, golob, čuješ (MC, 1994)
2. ...Jer bez tebe nema mene (CD/MC, 1996)
3. Croatian folk songs from Međimurje (MC, 1998)
4. Iz globline srca (CD/MC, 1998)
5. Četiri frtalji (CD/MC, 2000)
6. Da sam barem guska (CD/MC, 2002)
7. Polje široko, nebo visoko (CD/MC, 2005)
8. Kite i kitice (CD/MC, 2007)
9. Dođe Božić oj, koledo! (CD/MC, 2008)
10. Spevala mi papiga (CD/MC, 2009)
11. Jelen pase (2010)
12. 33 balade (3x CD, 2019) with Hrvoje Nikšić
13. Tamo gori (2020)
14. Svilarica svilu prede (2019) with Roko Margeta
15. Songbook Songs/Pjesme iz knjiga-pjesmarica (2020) with Roko Margeta
