= Lidija Bajuk =

Croatian singer-songwriter and poet

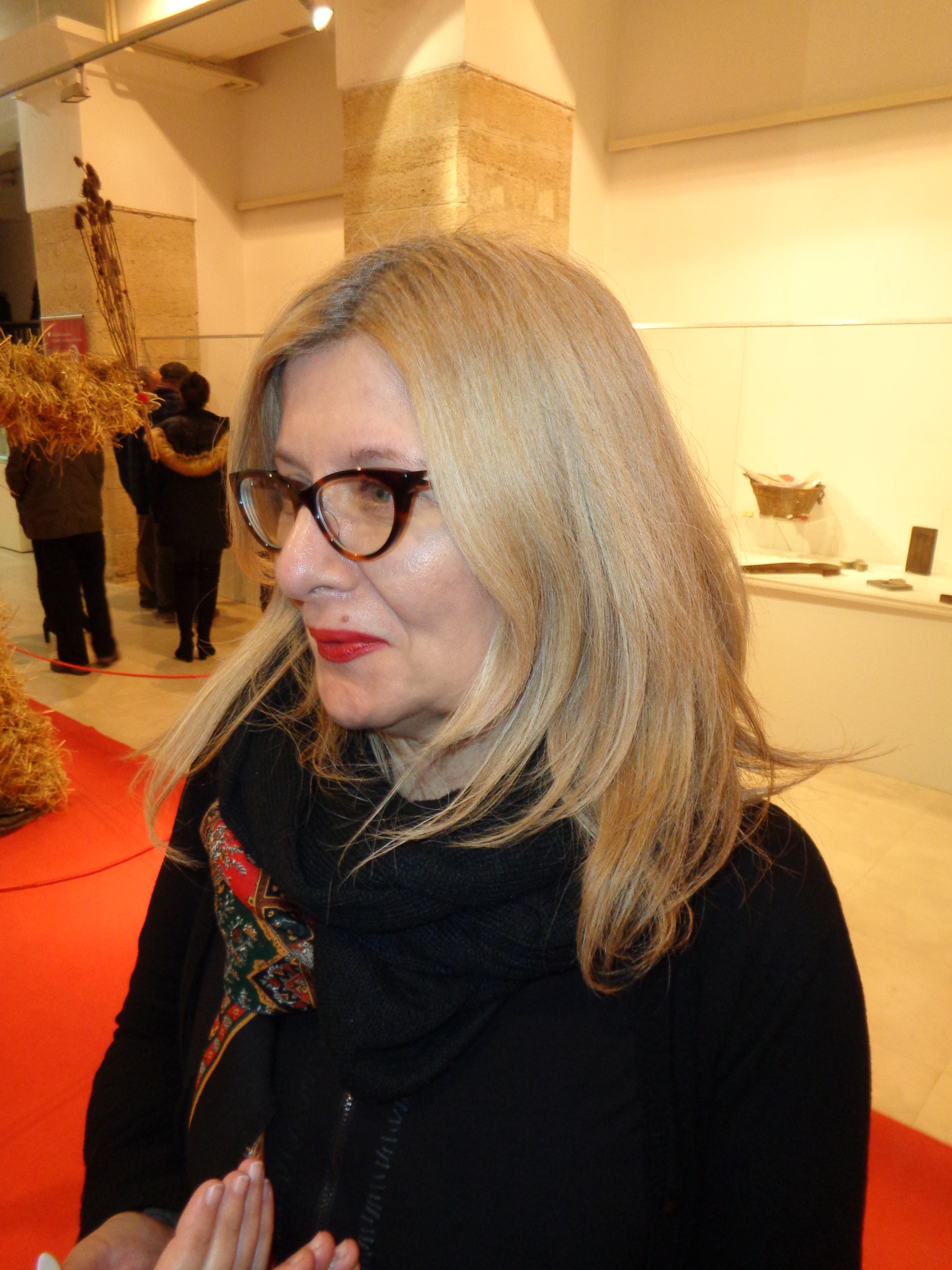
- Bajuk at the 2018 Night of museums in Čakovec
- Born: November 23, 1965 (age 60); Čakovec, SR Croatia, Yugoslavia
- Occupations: Singer, songwriter, poet
- Years active: 1987–present
- Website: http://www.lidijabajuk.com

Lidija Bajuk (born November 23, 1965, in Čakovec, SR Croatia, Yugoslavia) is a Croatian singer-songwriter and poet. She performs traditional Croatian folk songs, mostly from her native region of Međimurje, and writes songs inspired by traditional folk music. She has also published several collections of poetry and fairy tales based on Croatian folklore and Slavic mythology.

Along with Dunja Knebl and the band Legen, Lidija Bajuk has been noted to be a part of the contemporary Croatian ethno scene.

After she graduated from the Teacher's College Čakovec, Lidija Bajuk (www.lidijabajuk.com, www.hds.hr) worked as a teacher and librarian in her native province of Međimurje. Presently, she is based in Zagreb, the capitol of Croatia, where she began her career as a writer and musician, has worked as a music editor, and received diplomas in Ethnology and Anthropology. She is a doctoral candidate in post-graduate studies of Croatian culture, and is employed as an assistant in the Institute of Ethnology and Folklore in Zagreb. She has an interest in Croatian mythology and ethno-musicology.

Lidija's professional music career began in 1998, although her first public performances occurred at the concerts of John Mayall and Joan Baez in 1987 and 1989 in the former Yugoslavia. She is one of the founders of the contemporary Croatian ethnic music scene with the audio-album Ethno Ambient Live/Archaic Songs from Croatia (1994). Her music albums include Dawn-Maiden (1997), Kneya (1999), Spring Trees (2001), The Moon (2005), Cradle (2010), Matapur (2012) and Spinner (2015). She has also published seven poem collections: A Smile Is My Best Defense (1991), Roadless Journey (1992), Discourse With Silence (1995), She-Wolf (1999), Sandals On Water (2000), Pipilota's Poems (2004) and Paper Boat (2013); three books of stories: A Rose From My Heart (1995), Kneya (1999) and Kneya – The Fairy Forest (2002); one bilingual professional publication Matapur – Natural and Cultural Heritage of Međimurje (2012).

She works with various ecological and humanitarian associations. She has performed with a number of Croatian and foreign musicians. Lidija has composed and sung for film, theater, and dance choreography. In 2004 and 2012, her fairy tale prose about mythic creatures, Kneja, was staged in Osijek and Čakovec. As a member of the Association of Croatian Writers, the Croatian Composers Association, the Croatian Ethnological Society and Matrix Croatica, she co-operates with many educational, cultural, and academic institutions. She has won several Croatian awards for literature and music, as well as other awards at the 19th International Festival of Hutsuls in Ukrainian Kosiv. She is represented in the handbook The Rough Guide to World Music – Africa, Europe and the Middle East (World Music Network, London, 1999). At the end of 2010 she initiated actual field research in Međimurje. Since 2010 she is also the initiator and co-organizer of ethnographic field research throughout Croatia; also of two symposiums (Štrigova, Zagreb, 2012) on the cultural heritage of Upper Međimurje and traditional Kaikavian music; the VestaFesta – Festival Women's Traditional Music-Making (Vrpolje-Čačvina, 2014) and various multimedial projects: Virtual Traditional Music Museum of Međimurje (www.mtraditional.com), an exhibition on About Croatian Traditional Music of Međimurje and Environs (http://www.arhivx.net/htgm/?virtual=show&id=1), Center for Non-Material Culture of Međimurje, Zlatko Spoljar's Podravinian Song Book.

She leads workshops on mythic symbols in Croatian oral poetry, and periodically composes and sings for film and theater. HTV filmed several programs on its educational program based on her scenarios. She has had numerous artistic performances throughout Croatia and abroad (Italy, France, Spain, UK, Germany, Switzerland, Czech Republic, Ukraine, Russia, Hungary, Slovenia, BIH, Serbia, Greece, Nepal, Tibet, Canada, Columbia, Argentina, Brazil).

In 2006, she won the Porin award in the Best Folklore Song category and in 2015 for the best folklore and ethno album.

== Discography ==
1. Zora-Djevojka (1997)
2. Kneja (1999)
3. Tira Les (2001)
4. Luna (2005)
