= Osijek Pride =

Annual LGBT event in Osijek, Croatia

- Venue: open air
- Location: Osijek, Croatia
- Cause: celebration of the lesbian, gay, bisexual, and transgender (LGBT) people and their allies

Osijek Pride is an LGBT pride march in the Croatian city of Osijek. Osijek is the third city in Croatia to get its LGBT pride, after Zagreb (2002) and Split (2011). The first Osijek Pride took place on 6 September 2014. Approximately 200 participants marched through the city center, accompanied by about 100 police officers, though their intervention was not needed. Concerns about possible disturbances from the football fan group "Kohorta" proved unfounded, as did calls for the city to be empty during the Pride. Notable attendees included Croatia's Minister of Economy, Ivan Vrdoljak, a native of Osijek, who expressed his support for the Pride and emphasized the importance of tolerance and understanding for the future. The event featured banners with messages advocating for LGBT rights and acceptance, such as "Inati se Slavonijo" ("Persist, Slavonia", famous regional song by Kićo Slabinac), "Homophobes, stay in your four walls," and "Why do you disown your own child?"
