= List of countries by age at first marriage =

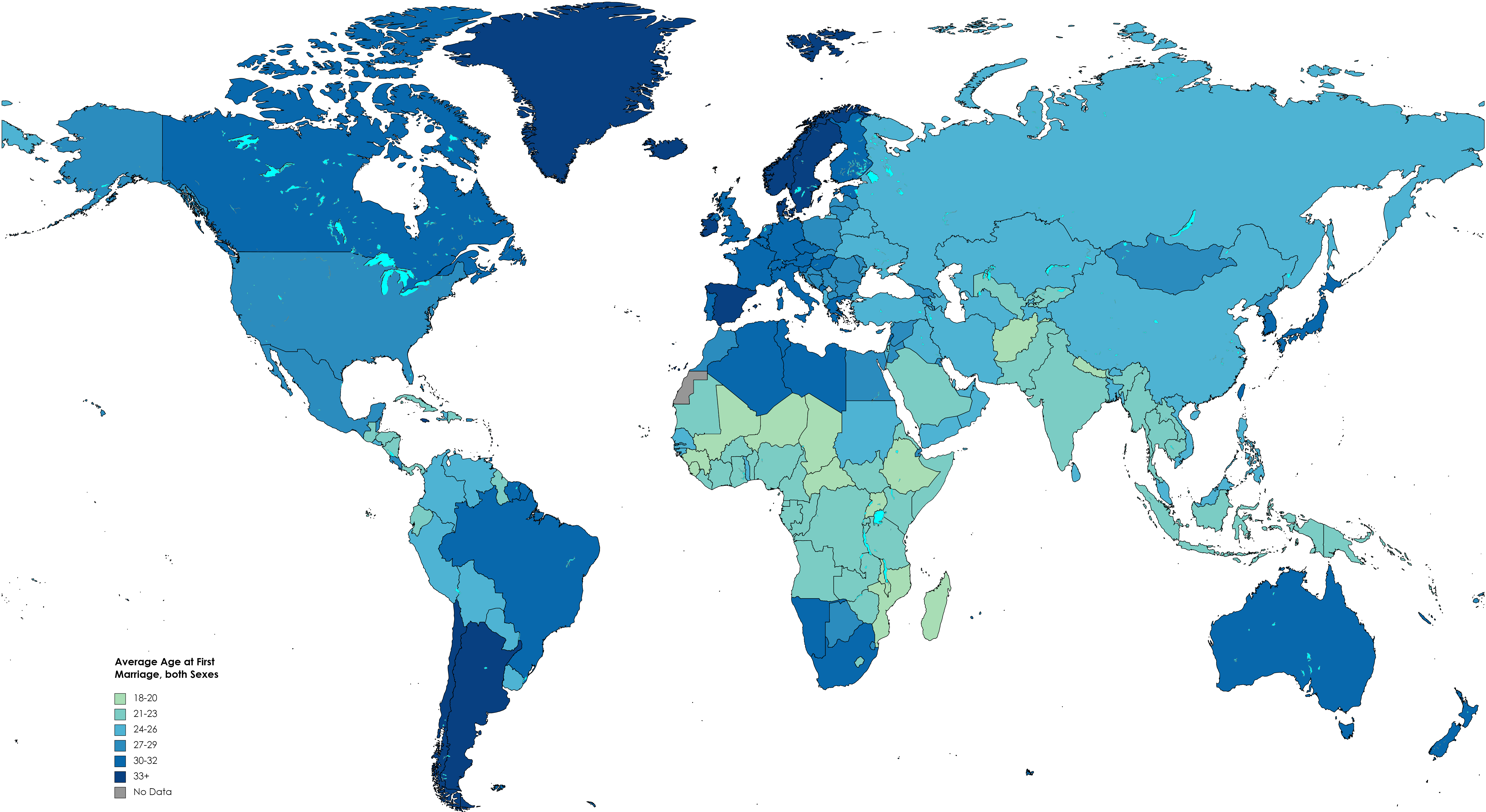
Map by color of age at first marriage

This is a list of countries by age at first marriage. The list is current from contemporary surveys. It does not treat the topic in history. Currency of information varies by country. Because the age distribution of people at first marriage is skewed with a longer tail towards older ages, the majority of people marry before the average age of first marriage. The median age is a more precise representation of when the majority of people marry; for most reporting sources, however, only the average age at marriage is reported.

== List ==
Country	Men	Women	Average	Age gap	Age ratio	Year	Source
Chile ^{(more info)}	39.4	37.8	38.6	1.6	1.04	2020	
Argentina	38.8	36.8	37.8	2	1.05	2020	
Norway	38.4	36.8	37.6	1.6	1.04	2023	
Ireland ^{(more info)}	37.8	35.0	36.4	2.8	1.08	2020	
Uruguay	37.2	34.8	36	2.4	1.07	2019	
Saint Lucia	36.1	34.9	35.5	1.2	1.03	2000	
Spain ^{(more info)}	36.3	34.3	35.3	2	1.06	2021	
Sweden	36.3	33.9	35.1	2.4	1.07	2019	
Germany ^{(more info)}	35.6	34.4	35	1.2	1.03	2019	
Denmark	36.2	33.4	34.8	2.8	1.08	2019	
Jamaica	35.4	33.8	34.6	1.6	1.05	2022	
Italy ^{(more info)}	35.2	33.6	34.4	1.6	1.05	2018	
Mauritius	36.4	32.4	34.4	4	1.12	2019	
Finland ^{(more info)}	35.2	33.2	34.2	2	1.06	2019	
Barbados	35.3	32.9	34.1	2.4	1.07	2000	
Iceland	34.6	32.7	33.7	1.9	1.06	2011	
Cape Verde (Note: Those surveyed were aged 25-29)	35.2	32.0	33.6	3.2	1.1	2019	
Grenada	35.2	32.0	33.6	3.2	1.1	2000	
France ^{(more info)}	34.4	32.8	33.6	1.6	1.05	2019	
Seychelles	35.3	31.1	33.2	4.2	1.14	2011	
Portugal	33.9	32.4	33.2	1.5	1.05	2019	
Luxembourg	34.3	31.8	33.1	2.5	1.08	2019	
South Africa (Note: Median ages are rounded) ^{(more info)}	35.0	31.0	33	4	1.13	2020	
South Korea ^{(more info)}	33.86	31.55	32.7	2.31	1.07	2024	
Liechtenstein	33.9	31.2	32.6	2.7	1.09	2019	
Costa Rica	34.0	31.0	32.5	3	1.1	2020	
Lebanon	34.4	30.4	32.4	4	1.13	2019	
Hong Kong	32.9	31.3	32.1	1.6	1.05	2025	
San Marino	33.5	30.7	32.1	2.8	1.09	2014	
Algeria ^{(more info)}	33.2	30.8	32	2.4	1.08	2020	
Mexico	33.4	30.6	32	2.8	1.09	2022	
Austria ^{(more info)}	33.2	30.8	32	2.4	1.08	2019	
Australia ^{(more info)}	33.2	30.8	32.0	2.4	1.08	2023	
Monaco	33.4	30.4	31.9	3	1.1	2008	
Netherlands	32.8	30.9	31.9	1.9	1.06	2021	
Slovenia	32.8	30.7	31.8	2.1	1.07	2019	
Saint Kitts and Nevis	32.1	31.3	31.7	0.8	1.03	1980	
Latvia	32.7	30.6	31.7	2.1	1.07	2019	
Taiwan ^{(more info)}	32.6	30.7	31.7	1.9	1.06	2020	
Switzerland ^{(more info)}	32.8	30.4	31.6	2.4	1.08	2019	
Greece ^{(more info)}	32.9	30.1	31.5	2.8	1.09	2017	
Hungary	32.8	30.1	31.5	2.7	1.09	2019	
United States ^{(more info)}	32.0	30.8	31.4	1.2	1.04	2024	
Bahrain	33.6	29.2	31.4	4.4	1.15	2018	
Estonia	32.3	30.4	31.4	1.9	1.06	2019	
Belgium	32.3	30.0	31.2	2.3	1.08	2015	
Suriname	32.8	29.3	31.1	3.5	1.12	2012	
Libya	32.0	30.0	31	2	1.07	2003	
Czech Republic ^{(more info)}	32.2	29.8	31	2.4	1.08	2017	
New Zealand ^{(more info)}	31.6	30.4	31.0	1.2	1.04	2020	
Poland ^{(more info)}	32.2	29.4	30.8	2.8	1.1	2020	
Palau	31.9	29.6	30.8	2.3	1.08	2009	
Georgia	31.9	29.4	30.7	2.5	1.09	2021	
Slovakia ^{(more info)}	31.9	29.4	30.7	2.5	1.09	2019	
Canada ^{(more info)}	30.8	30.4	30.6	0.4	1.01	2022	
Bulgaria ^{(more info)}	32.0	29.1	30.6	2.9	1.1	2019	
Tunisia	32.9	28.2	30.6	4.7	1.17	2014	
Trinidad and Tobago	31.8	29.2	30.5	2.6	1.09	2011	
Oman	32.1	28.9	30.5	3.2	1.11	2009	
Namibia	31.7	29.2	30.5	2.5	1.09	2006-2007	
Israel ^{(more info)}	31.6	29.2	30.4	2.4	1.08	2019	
Japan ^{(more info)}	31.1	29.7	30.4	1.4	1.05	2023	
Brazil	31.5	29.2	30.4	2.3	1.08	2022	
Qatar	31.3	29.4	30.4	1.9	1.06	2018	
Malaysia ^{(more info)}	31.0	29.4	30.2	1.6	1.05	2022	
Croatia ^{(more info)}	31.5	28.9	30.2	2.6	1.09	2019	
Ukraine ^{(more info)}	31.2	29.2	30.2	2	1.07	2020	
Cyprus ^{(more info)}	30.7	29.6	30.2	1.1	1.04	2019	
Serbia	31.4	28.6	30	2.8	1.1	2019	
United Kingdom ^{(more info)}	31.0	29.0	30	2	1.07	2022	
Romania	31.6	28.3	30	3.3	1.12	2019	
Singapore ^{(more info)}	30.1	29.5	29.8	0.6	1.02	2023	
Montenegro	31.1	28.0	29.6	3.1	1.11	2019	
Lithuania	30.7	28.3	29.5	2.4	1.08	2019	
Malta	30.5	28.5	29.5	2	1.07	2011	
Federated States of Micronesia	30.5	28.5	29.5	2	1.07	2019	
Djibouti	31.3	27.4	29.4	3.9	1.14	2009	
Belize	30.1	28.6	29.4	1.5	1.05	2010	
Albania	30.9	27.8	29.4	3.1	1.11	2019	
Kuwait	29.9	28.7	29.3	1.2	1.04	2018	
Thailand	30.8	27.6	29.2	3.2	1.12	2021	
Syria	31.8	26.3	29.1	5.5	1.21	2016	
Jordan ^{(more info)}	31.3	26.6	29	4.7	1.18	2021	
Bahamas	30.6	27.0	28.8	3.6	1.13	2010	
Armenia	30.5	27.1	28.8	3.4	1.13	2019	
Palestine (Note: West Bank only) ^{(more info)}	31.4	26.2	28.8	5.2	1.2	2019	
Botswana	30.9	26.4	28.7	4.5	1.17	2001	
Eswatini	30.5	26.5	28.5	4	1.15	2007	
Morocco	31.3	25.7	28.5	5.6	1.22	2019	
Samoa	30.7	26.1	28.4	4.6	1.18	2018	
North Macedonia	29.6	26.9	28.3	2.7	1.1	2019	
Bosnia and Herzegovina	29.5	26.8	28.2	2.7	1.1	2019	
Egypt ^{(more info)}	31.0	25.0	28	6	1.24	2019	
Turkey ^{(more info)}	29.0	27.0	28	2	1.07	2020	
Kenya	29.6	25.6	27.6	4	1.16	2018-2019	
Senegal	31.4	23.8	27.6	7.6	1.32	2020	
Saudi Arabia ^{(more info)}	29.3	25.9	27.6	3.4	1.13	2019	
Russia ^{(more info)}	29.2	26.0	27.6	3.2	1.12	2020	
Mongolia	29.0	26.0	27.5	3	1.12	2019	
Fiji	29.3	25.7	27.5	3.6	1.14	2019	
Moldova	28.9	26.0	27.5	2.9	1.11	2019	
North Korea ^{(more info)}	29.0	25.5	27.3	3.5	1.14	2008	
China ^{(more info)}	28.8	25.6	27.2	3.2	1.13	2021	
Vietnam ^{(more info)}	29.3	25.1	27.2	4.2	1.17	2023	
Belarus	28.3	26.1	27.2	2.2	1.08	2019	
Antigua and Barbuda	29.0	25.0	27	4	1.16	2001	
Pakistan ^{(more info)}	28.4	25.6	27	2.8	1.11	2019	
Haiti	28.7	24.9	26.8	3.8	1.15	2016	
Philippines ^{(more info)}	28.2	25.4	26.8	2.8	1.11	2018	
Iraq	28.2	25.3	26.8	2.9	1.11	2004	
Ecuador	28.3	25.1	26.7	3.2	1.13	2020	
Gambia	30.7	22.7	26.7	8	1.35	2019	
Marshall Islands	27.1	25.6	26.4	1.5	1.06	2019	
Kazakhstan	27.6	25.0	26.3	2.6	1.1	2019	
Brunei	27.3	25.1	26.2	2.2	1.09	1991	
Azerbaijan	28.1	24.0	26.1	4.1	1.17	2019	
United Arab Emirates ^{(more info)}	26.8	25.3	26.1	1.5	1.06	2005	
Bangladesh ^{(more info)}	27.2	24.8	26	2.4	1.1	2019	
Iran ^{(more info)}	28.0	24.0	26	4	1.17	2017	
Tuvalu (Note: Those surveyed were aged 20-49)	28.2	23.3	25.8	4.9	1.21	2019	
Peru	27.5	23.5	25.5	4	1.17	2012	
Sudan ^{(more info)}	28.9	21.9	25.4	7	1.32	2014	
Kyrgyzstan	27.2	23.6	25.4	3.6	1.15	2019	
Bolivia	26.6	24.1	25.4	2.5	1.1	2012	
Sri Lanka ^{(more info)}	27.2	23.4	25.3	3.8	1.16	2012	
Mozambique	27.6	22.8	25.2	4.8	1.21	2020	
Angola	26.7	23.4	25.1	3.3	1.14	2009	
Togo	27.6	22.3	25	5.3	1.24	2014	
Eritrea	29.1	20.6	24.9	8.5	1.41	2002	
Paraguay ^{(more info)}	26.8	22.7	24.8	4.1	1.18	2002	
Uzbekistan	26.6	22.7	24.7	3.9	1.17	2019	
Ethiopia	26.8	22.3	24.6	4.5	1.2	2019	
Yemen	26.1	23.0	24.6	3.1	1.13	2013	
Guinea-Bissau	28.1	20.9	24.5	7.2	1.34	2000	
Saint Vincent and the Grenadines	27.8	21.2	24.5	6.6	1.31	2012	
Colombia	26.2	22.7	24.5	3.5	1.15	2015	
Venezuela	25.8	22.9	24.4	2.9	1.13	2011	
Tonga (Note: Those surveyed were aged 25-49)	25.0	23.6	24.3	1.4	1.06	2012	
Madagascar	25.5	22.8	24.2	2.7	1.12	2019	
Tajikistan	26.2	22.1	24.2	4.1	1.19	2019	
Bhutan	25.4	22.8	24.1	2.6	1.11	2007	
Congo	26.1	22.0	24.1	4.1	1.19	2016	
South Sudan	27.6	20.4	24	7.2	1.35	2019	
El Salvador	25.5	22.5	24	3	1.13	2007	
Afghanistan	25.6	22.4	24	3.2	1.14	2020	
Turkmenistan	24.6	23.3	24	1.3	1.06	2006	
Guinea	28.0	19.8	23.9	8.2	1.41	2014	
Guatemala	25.0	22.7	23.9	2.3	1.1	2018	
Ghana ^{(more info)}	25.7	21.7	23.7	4	1.18	2008	
DR Congo	26.2	21.0	23.6	5.2	1.25	2019	
Somalia	26.5	20.6	23.6	5.9	1.29	1982	
Panama	25.3	21.6	23.5	3.7	1.17	2010	
Gabon	25.5	21.4	23.5	4.1	1.19	2007	
Guyana	25.4	21.5	23.5	3.9	1.18	2009	
Cuba ^{(more info)}	25.4	21.3	23.4	4.1	1.19	2012	
Equatorial Guinea	26.1	20.5	23.3	5.6	1.27	2011	
Lesotho	25.5	20.9	23.2	4.6	1.22	2009	
Zambia	25.7	20.7	23.2	5	1.24	2011	
Indonesia ^{(more info)}	25.4	21.0	23.2	4.4	1.21	2020	
Papua New Guinea	25.0	21.4	23.2	3.6	1.17	2006	
Mauritania ^{(more info)}	27.1	19.2	23.2	7.9	1.41	2008-2009	
Burkina Faso	26.3	19.9	23.1	6.4	1.32	2018	
Ivory Coast	26.7	19.5	23.1	7.2	1.37	2005	
Malawi	25.3	20.9	23.1	4.4	1.21	2019	
Comoros	25.6	20.4	23	5.2	1.25	1996	
Burundi	24.6	21.3	23	3.3	1.15	2019	
Solomon Islands	25.6	20.3	23.0	5.3	1.26	2007	
Maldives	24.1	21.6	22.9	2.5	1.12	2009	
Myanmar ^{(more info)}	24.6	21.1	22.9	3.5	1.17	2009	
Cameroon ^{(more info)}	26.0	19.6	22.8	6.4	1.33	2017	
Timor-Leste	25.0	20.6	22.8	4.4	1.21	2009-2010	
Rwanda	24.7	20.6	22.7	4.1	1.2	2010	
Honduras	24.1	21.2	22.7	2.9	1.14	2012	
India ^{(more info)}	24.1	21.1	22.6	3	1.14	2021	
Vanuatu (Note: Those surveyed were aged 25+)	24.4	20.8	22.6	3.6	1.17	2013	
Mali	26.0	19.1	22.6	6.9	1.36	2018	
Nicaragua	24.4	20.6	22.5	3.8	1.18	2005	
Nauru	23.2	21.6	22.4	1.6	1.07	2009	
Uganda	24.4	20.2	22.3	4.2	1.21	2018	
Zimbabwe	24.6	19.9	22.3	4.7	1.24	2010-2011	
Chad	25.3	19.1	22.2	6.2	1.32	2011	
Cambodia ^{(more info)}	23.4	21.0	22.2	2.4	1.11	2010	
Benin	24.4	19.9	22.2	4.5	1.23	2012	
Central African Republic	23.7	20.3	22	3.4	1.17	2019	
Nigeria ^{(more info)}	24.8	19.2	22	5.6	1.29	2018	
Laos	23.3	20.5	21.9	2.8	1.14	2012	
Nepal	23.6	20.1	21.9	3.5	1.17	2016	
Kiribati	23.6	20.1	21.9	3.5	1.17	2009	
São Tomé and Príncipe	24.1	19.1	21.6	5	1.26	2008-2009	
Tanzania	23.8	19.0	21.4	4.8	1.25	2010	
Liberia	23.0	19.0	21	4	1.21	2009	
Niger	22.8	19.2	21	3.6	1.19	2017	

== See also ==
- Age of consent
- List of countries by marriage and divorce rates
- Marriageable age
