= Marriage in Europe =

Wikimedia disambiguation page

Marriage in Europe includes:

- Western European marriage pattern
- Recognition of same-sex unions in Europe
- Marriage in Austria
- Marriage in Croatia
- Marriage in Cyprus
- Marriage in the Czech Republic
- Marriage in France
- Marriage in Germany
- Marriage in Greece
- Marriage in the Republic of Ireland
- Marriage in Poland
- Marriage in Russia
- Marriage in Slovakia
- Marriage in Spain
- Marriage in Turkey
- Marriage in Ukraine
- Marriage in the United Kingdom
  - Marriage in England and Wales
  - Marriage in Northern Ireland
  - Marriage in Scotland
