= Marriage age =

Marriage age may refer to:

- List of countries by age at first marriage
- Marriageable age, the minimum legal age for marriage
