= Marriage in Ireland =

Marriage in Ireland can refer to

- Marriage in Northern Ireland
- Marriage in the Republic of Ireland
