= Recognition of same-sex unions in Croatia =

Croatia has recognized life partnerships for same-sex couples since 5 August 2014. The Croatian Parliament passed the Life Partnership Act on 15 July 2014 by 86 votes to 16, granting same-sex couples equal rights and benefits to married couples in almost all aspects. The legislation was signed by President Ivo Josipović, and took effect on 5 August, though some sections of the law went into force on 1 September 2014. Croatia first recognized same-sex unregistered cohabitation in 2003, providing some inheritance and financial benefits to same-sex partners.

Following a 2013 referendum, the Constitution of Croatia has limited marriage to opposite-sex couples.

== Unregistered cohabitation ==
In 2003, the governing coalition of Prime Minister Ivica Račan, consisting mostly of centre-left parties, passed a law recognizing same-sex unregistered cohabitation (neregistrirana kohabitacija). Initially, the draft bill would have recognized registered partnerships providing most of the rights of marriage, but the Croatian Peasant Party threatened to leave the coalition if it insisted on this version of the law. The bill was amended to grant same-sex partners only limited rights, including in the areas of inheritance and alimony, and subsequently passed in the Croatian Parliament. The law requires that couples cohabit for at least three years, and does not provide any rights in terms of adoption, taxes, joint property ownership, health insurance or pensions.

== Life partnerships ==
=== Early bills ===
In early 2006, the Croatian Parliament rejected a registered partnership bill introduced by MP Šime Lučin of the Social Democratic Party and Independent MP Ivo Banac, by 22 votes to 76 with 5 abstentions. MP Lucija Čikeš, a member of the ruling Croatian Democratic Union (HDZ), called for the proposal to be rejected because "all universe is heterosexual, from an atom and the smallest particle, from a fly to an elephant". Another HDZ MP objected on the basis that "85% of the population considers itself Catholic and the Church is against heterosexual and homosexual equality". Medical and psychological professionals opposed these statements, arguing that all members of Parliament had a duty to vote according to the Constitution of Croatia, which prohibits discrimination.

=== Life Partnership Act ===
Laws regarding same-sex partnerships in Europe¹ Marriage Civil union Limited domestic recognition (cohabitation) Unrecognized Constitution limits marriage to opposite-sex couples ¹ May include recent laws or court decisions that have not yet entered into effect.

On 11 May 2012, Prime Minister Zoran Milanović announced that the government would soon pass legislation expanding the rights of same-sex partners. At this point, it was unknown what form this recognition would take, though it was likely that Croatian family law would not be modified and that the legislation of same-sex marriage was not being considered. Deputy Prime Minister Milanka Opačić also expressed support for same-sex parenting, as did ministers Vesna Pusić and Predrag Matić. On the International Day Against Homophobia, Transphobia and Biphobia in 2012, LGBT groups met with Minister of Public Administration Arsen Bauk, who announced that the government was considering a law regulating same-sex life partnerships (Croatian: životno partnerstvo, pronounced [ʒǐvotno pârtnerstvo]). (Note: In some minority languages of Croatia: Czech: registrované partnerství, pronounced [ˈrɛɡɪstrovanɛː ˈpartnɛrstviː]; Hungarian: bejegyzett élettársi kapcsolat, pronounced [ˈbɛ.jɛɟzɛtː ˈeːlɛtːaːrʃi ˈkɒptʃolɒt]; Istro-Romanian: unywon sivila; Istriot: ugnòn civil; Italian: unione civile, pronounced [uˈnjoːne tʃiˈviːle]; Rusyn: горожанськоє цимборенє, gorožans'koje tsimborenje; Serbian: животно партнерство, životno partnerstvo, pronounced [ʒǐvotno pârtnerstvo]; Slovak: registrované partnerstvo, pronounced [ˈreɡistrɔʋaneː ˈpartɲerstʋɔ]) Bauk expressed strong support for LGBT rights, calling on lawmakers to show a greater commitment to equality. He specifically referred to several politicians who had expressed support for LGBT equality, but were willing to make concessions because "society might not be ready for certain changes". Marko Jurčić from Zagreb Pride called for life partnerships to be open to all couples, not just same-sex couples. Zagreb Pride later helped a government working group co-draft the bill, and led a public campaign called "It's time for life partnerships".

The Ministry of Public Administration and the government working group responsible for drafting the partnership law met for the first time on 6 September 2012, with the bill expected to be introduced to the Croatian Parliament sometime in 2013. On 16 November 2012, Jagoda Botički, who led the working group, confirmed that the draft law would allow same-sex couples to register their relationships at registry offices, but that it would not apply to different-sex couples. Botički said that the group was in the process of meeting several government ministries to evaluate which legal rights and benefits would be granted to life partners. Two LGBT associations, Iskorak and Kontra, said they were "satisfied" that life partners would be able to register their relationships at registry offices, but expressed "disappointment" that same-sex couples would remain excluded from family law. This exclusion would potentially mean fewer rights for life partners due to political concessions, particularly affecting families with children, as this was the most controversial area for opponents of the law. On 2 August 2013, Bauk stated that the law would be called the Life Partnership Act (Croatian: Zakon o životnom partnerstvu), that registration of life partnerships would be identical to marriage, and that the law would treat same-sex couples equally to married couples in all areas except adoption, although he said that stepchild adoption was being considered. The Croatian People's Party – Liberal Democrats (HNS) expressed support for full adoption rights. Public consultations on the law were announced for the following month, and introduction to the Parliament by the end of 2013.

The draft law was published on 4 November 2013. Although it did not include joint adoption, it would allow life partners to receive partial, and in some cases full, parental responsibility over their partner's child. The bill would also enable life partners to become "partner-guardians". It would define same-sex partners as a family—while not explicitly modifying Croatian family law—and ban discrimination on the basis of partnership status. It would also stipulate that future changes to family law regarding marriage must also include life partnerships. According to articles 73, 74 and 75 of the Life Partnership Act, same-sex marriages and domestic partnerships performed abroad would be recognized as life partnerships in Croatia. This included unregistered cohabitation where couples had been living together for at least 3 years, which would be recognized as informal life partnerships. Further, the law would not require life partners to be Croatian nationals or permanent residents. According to law experts, this would make the Life Partnership Act one of the most liberal same-sex partnership laws in Europe. Bauk stated:

[The Life Partnership Act] represents a democratic compromise, and creates conditions which will make all apparatuses needed to build a family life based on feelings of intimate emotional attachment and mutual trust available to same-sex communities, while at the same time expressing respect towards the current attachment of our fellow citizens to the traditional notion of marriage.

The Croatian Government expressed its support for the proposed bill on 12 December 2013. On 29 January 2014, the Parliamentary Committee on Human and National Minority Rights approved the legislation, with 6 members in favor and 2 against. It also passed the Gender Equality Committee. The Croatian Democratic Union expressed opposition to the measure. It was introduced to the Parliament on 27 February, and amended following public debate. The government approved a final version of the bill on 24 June. It passed its second reading on 10 July. Parliament approved the law in its final reading on 15 July by 89 votes to 16. It was signed by President Ivo Josipović, and published in the Narodne novine on 28 July. The law took effect on 5 August 2014, except for sections on parental responsibility, which came into force on 1 September 2014.

The first life partnership was registered between two men in Zagreb on 5 September 2014. Minister Bauk was present at the ceremony, and presented the couple with two neckties as a gift from the Croatian state. The second partnership took place in Split on 18 September.

=== Adoption and parenting ===
The Life Partnership Act established an institution similar to stepchild adoption called "partner-guardianship" (partnerska skrb). A life partner who is not the biological parent of their partner's child can take on parental responsibilities on either a temporary or permanent basis. During a life partnership, the biological parent may temporarily delegate parental rights to their life partner. If these rights extend beyond 30 days, the arrangement must be certified by a solicitor. While these rights are in effect, both the biological parent and the life partner must jointly make decisions concerning the child's well-being. In the event of a dissolution of the life partnership, the non-biological partner may maintain a personal relationship with the child, if the court determines that this is in the child's best interest. Partner-guardianships can also be established if both of the child's biological parents are deceased, or if one parent is deceased or unknown and the other has had their parental rights terminated due to abuse. Both formal and informal life partners are eligible to apply for partner-guardianship. If granted by the court, the partner-guardian accepts full parental responsibilities and is recorded as such on the child's birth certificate. Partner-guardianship constitutes a permanent next-of-kin relationship, carrying the same rights, duties and legal consequences as a biological parent-child relationship. The first case of a partner-guardianship was reported on 13 July 2015.

In May 2017, a male couple in a life partnership filed a lawsuit after being denied the right to foster a child, based on the fact that Croatian law did not grant life partnerships full adoption rights. Prior to the lawsuit, the couple had successfully completed a course designed to prepare potential adoptive and foster parents. Although Croatian law did not explicitly grant joint adoption rights to life partners, the couple argued that the Life Partnership Act and the Family Code both affirm that life partnerships must be treated equally to marriage. Additionally, the Life Partnership Act states that any matters involving children not covered under the "partner-guardian" status are to be resolved in accordance with the Family Code. The couple also stated that, if the court ruled against them, they were prepared to appeal the case to the European Court of Human Rights.

On 20 December 2019, the Zagreb Administrative Court ruled in the couple's favour, affirming their right to become foster parents. Their attorney, Sanja Bezbradica Jelavić, commented: "The court's decision is binding, and an appeal is not allowed, so this judgment is final. The written ruling has not yet arrived, but as stated during the announcement, the court accepted our argument in the lawsuit, based on Croatian regulations and the European Convention on Human Rights. As a result, the court ordered the relevant government agencies to implement the new decision in accordance with the judgment. We believe that the agencies will respect the court decision." This ruling came in the context of the Foster Care Act (Zakon o udomiteljstvu), introduced in December 2018, which explicitly excluded same-sex couples from fostering children. The Constitutional Court ruled on appeal on 7 February 2020 that same-sex couples have the right to become foster parents. In its written opinion, the court held "that the impugned legal provisions which left out a certain social group produces general discriminatory consequences against same-sex persons living in formal and informal life partnerships, which is constitutionally unacceptable." President of the Constitutional Court Miroslav Šeparović further stated: "The point of this decision is that opportunity to provide foster care service must be given to everyone under the same conditions, regardless of whether the potential foster parents are of same-sex orientation. This does not mean that they are privileged, but their foster care must be allowed if they meet the legal requirements".

Joint adoption for same-sex couples has been allowed since 2022. In May 2021, the Administrative Court in Zagreb ruled in favour of a same-sex couple, Mladen Kožić and Ivo Šegota, granting them the right to jointly adopt a child. The couple had filed a lawsuit against the Ministry of Demographics, Family, Youth and Social Policy after being denied the opportunity to adopt. The court found that denying adoption solely on the basis of the couple’s sexual orientation and life partnership status was unconstitutional. The High Administrative Court upheld the lower court ruling on 26 May 2022.

=== Developments in 2017–present ===
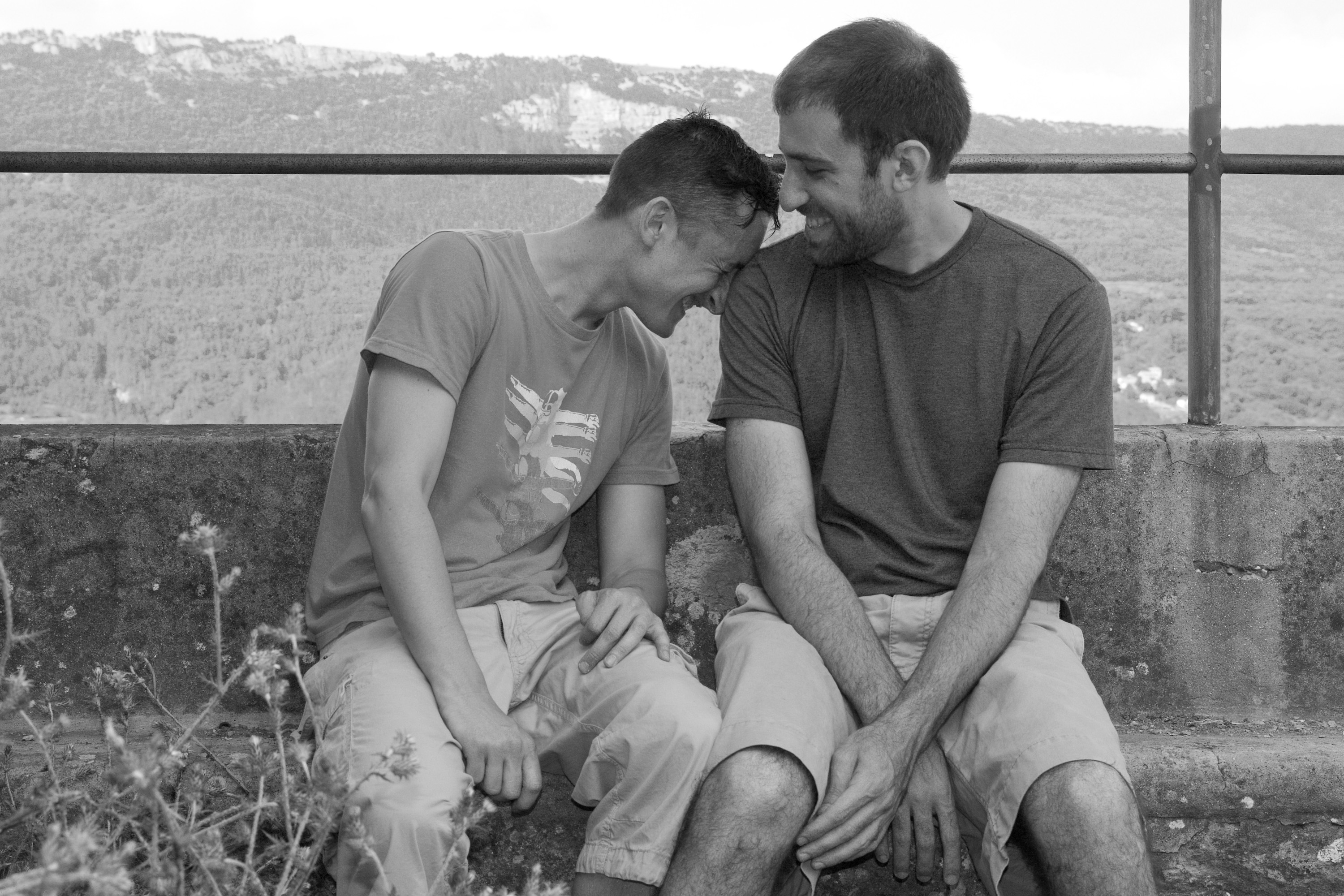
A same-sex couple in Istria, 2007

In September 2017, the ruling coalition of Prime Minister Andrej Plenković, consisting of the Croatian Democratic Union and the Croatian People's Party, rejected a draft proposal granting married couples access to social welfare benefits. This bill would have only applied to married couples, and was ultimately withdrawn after protests from organisations and activists. Sanja Baric, a professor at the University of Rijeka, told Balkan Insight that if such a narrow definition of the family had been established in law, a constitutional review would have likely overturned it. She cited multiple rulings from the European Court of Human Rights which have defined the family as including single people with children, same-sex couples and grandparents with grandchildren, among other types of families.

=== Statistics ===
Approximately 40 life partnerships had taken place in Croatia by mid-December 2014, mostly in Zagreb. Most partners were Croatian citizens, but there were some partnerships where one of the partners was a citizen of another country, including the United Kingdom, Austria, Slovenia, Japan, Italy, Serbia and Bosnia and Herzegovina. The first life partnership where both partners were foreign citizens was performed in Osijek between two Macedonian women on 20 February 2015, which was also the first partnership conducted in that city. By May 2015, only one partnership dissolution had occurred. 72 life partnerships were performed in 2015; 38 between two men and 34 between two women. Most were conducted in Zagreb and Primorje-Gorski Kotar County. The first partnership between prison inmates took place on 23 September 2016 in Gospić.

By the end of 2018, 360 life partnerships had taken place in Croatia; mostly in Zagreb (188), followed by Istria (28), Primorje-Gorski Kotar (27), Split-Dalmatia (12), Osijek-Baranja (7) and Varaždin (7), Dubrovnik-Neretva (4) and Vukovar-Srijem (4), Bjelovar-Bilogora (3), Brod-Posavina (2), Krapina-Zagorje (2), Šibenik-Knin (2) and Zadar (2), and Karlovac (1), Koprivnica-Križevci (1), Lika-Senj (1), Međimurje (1) and Sisak-Moslavina (1).

== Same-sex marriage ==
=== Background ===
Several politicians have expressed support for same-sex marriage in Croatia, mostly members of the Social Democratic Party (SDS), the Croatian People's Party – Liberal Democrats (HNS), the Social Liberal Party (HSLS), the Green List and the Croatian Labourists – Labour Party. This includes notably Vesna Pusić, the former Minister of Foreign and European Affairs, Mirela Holy, the former Ministry of Environmental Protection and Energy, and former President Ivo Josipović.

In April 2018, Parliament ratified the Council of Europe Convention on preventing and combating violence against women and domestic violence, which aims to safeguard the rights of women against domestic violence, by 110 votes to 30. Some right-wing groups and the Catholic Church opposed the ratification, falsely claiming that it would legalise same-sex marriage.

=== Constitutional ban and 2013 referendum ===
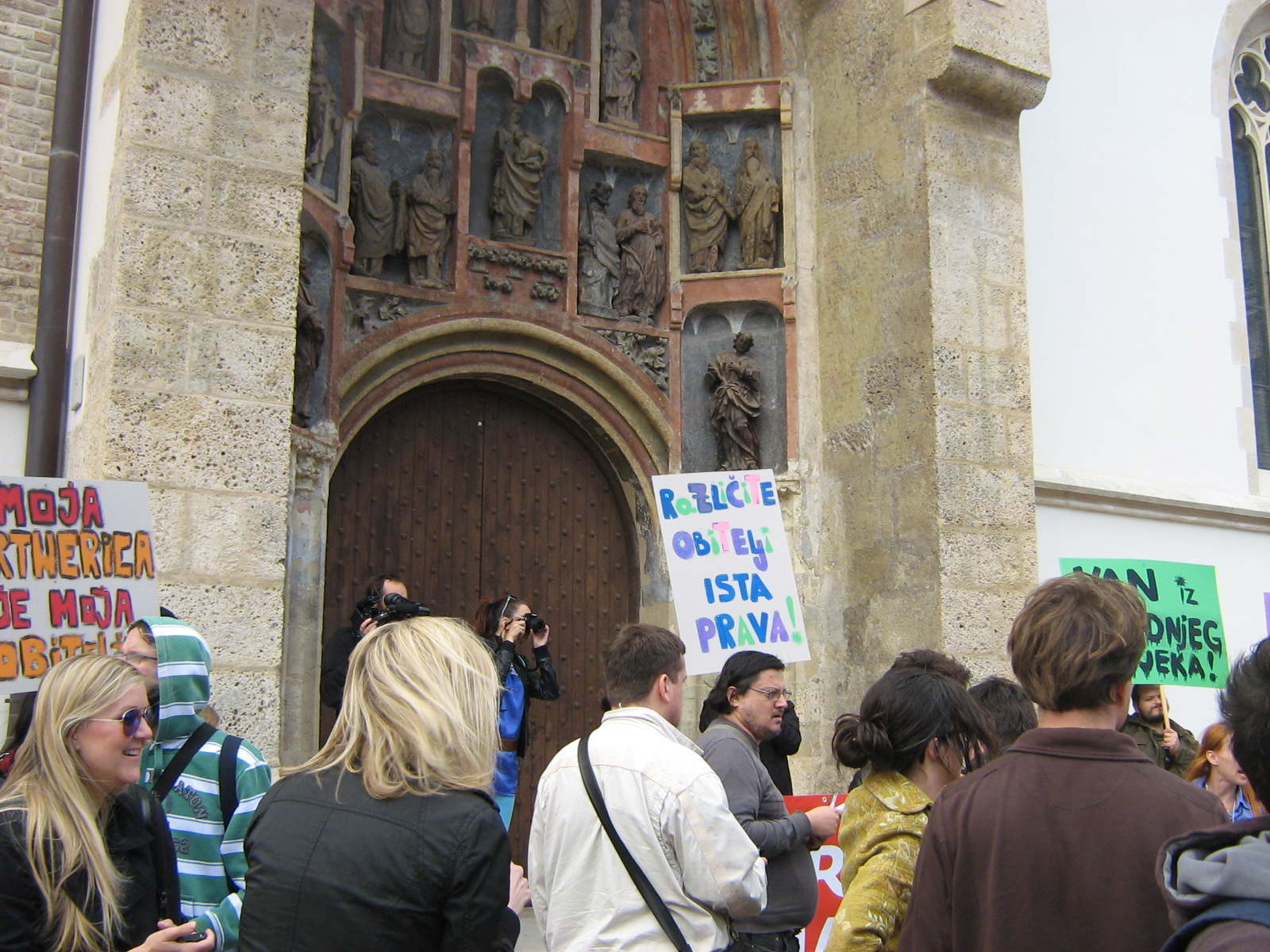
Participants campaigning for same-sex marriage at Zagreb Pride in front of St. Mark's Church, May 2013

In 2013, a conservative group called "On Behalf of the Family" (U ime obitelji) collected more than 700,000 signatures for a referendum to constitutionally define marriage as "a union between a woman and a man". The petition required a minimum of 450,000 signatures, representing 10% of registered voters. The government and President Josipović expressed opposition to the referendum, arguing that it violated the Constitution of Croatia and referendum laws. The Catholic Church played a significant role in collecting the signatures, with many volunteers stationed in front of churches. According to a poll conducted in August 2013, 55% of respondents supported the initiative, while 31% were opposed.

Parliament voted against challenging the constitutionality of the referendum proposal at the Constitutional Court. However, three non-governmental organizations—Zagreb Pride, the Centre for Civil Courage (Centar za građansku hrabrost), and CroL—later filed a case with the court. The court ruled against the organizations in November 2013, arguing that the referendum was constitutional and that there was no legal basis for banning it, although the court also ruled that defining marriage as "a union between a woman and a man" did not prevent the Parliament from enacting civil partnership legislation. Jadranka Kosor, who served as prime minister between 2009 and 2011, voted against the constitutional change, despite her previous views on homosexuality and same-sex unions; she had been voted "homophobe of the year" in 2010 after stating that homosexuality "was not natural". However, she has expressed support for life partnerships. Human rights organisations campaigned strongly against the referendum. The newspaper Jutarnji list donated its advertising space to several organisations opposing the referendum. Some religious groups also called on voters to reject the proposed constitutional change. In November, popular entertainers Severina, The Beat Fleet and Let 3 organised a concert in support of same-sex marriage at the Ban Jelačić Square, gathering thousands of attendees, while various student groups also organised petitions in support of same-sex marriage. On 30 November, one day before the referendum, around 1,000 people marched in Zagreb in support of same-sex marriage, with marches also occurring in Pula, Split and Rijeka.

The referendum took place on 1 December 2013. 66.3% voted in favour of the constitutional change, while 33.7% voted against. Turnout was low, as only 37.9% of voters participated. The majority of counties voted in favour of the amendment, with only Istria and Primorje-Gorski Kotar voting against. The highest "No" vote was recorded in Labin at 71.3%, while the highest "Yes" vote was recorded in Lećevica at 99.2%. Major cities that opposed the amendment include Pula (64.0%), Rijeka (59.6%), Čakovec (59.2%) and Varaždin (57.3%). Article 61 of the Constitution now reads:

The family shall enjoy special protection of the state. Marriage is a living union between a man and a woman. Marriage and legal relations in marriage, common-law marriage and the family shall be regulated by law. (Note: Croatian: Obitelj je pod osobitom zaštitom države. Brak je životna zajednica žene i muškarca. Brak i pravni odnosi u braku, izvanbračnoj zajednici i obitelji uređuju se zakonom.)

In the aftermath of the referendum, the government began working on changes to the referendum process, defining what type of questions can be subjected to a popular vote and imposing a 50% turnout. President Josipović also suggested that other forms of unions should be protected by the Constitution to "balance the injustice created by the referendum", but his proposal was rejected. In May 2018, the Social Democratic Party launched an initiative to amend the Constitution to prevent referendums designed to "reduce fundamental civil rights and freedoms".

=== Developments in 2025–present ===
On 22 November 2025, the European Court of Justice (ECJ) ruled in Jakub Cupriak-Trojan and Mateusz Trojan v Wojewoda Mazowiecki, a Polish case, that all member states of the European Union must recognise same-sex marriages validly performed within the European Union. The case involved a dual Polish-German couple who had married in Germany but sought recognition of their marriage in Poland. The ruling had an immediate legal effect in Croatia as well, with media outlets reporting that "authorities must recognize same-sex marriages performed abroad as full marriages, rather than just granting them the limited rights of a registered partnership". Cupriak-Trojan and Trojan does not compel Croatia to change its domestic laws to legalise same-sex marriage, but it does require that the country accept the legal status of couples married elsewhere in the European Union.

== Public opinion ==
The 2015 Eurobarometer found that 37% of Croatians thought that same-sex marriage should be allowed throughout Europe. A Pew Research Center poll published in May 2017 found that 31% of Croatians supported same-sex marriage, while 64% were opposed. Support was highest among religiously-unaffiliated respondents at 61%, but decreased to 29% among Catholics. The 2019 Eurobarometer showed that 39% of Croatians thought same-sex marriage should be allowed throughout Europe, while 55% were opposed.

The 2023 Eurobarometer found that support for same-sex marriage had increased to 42%, whilst 51% remained opposed. The survey also showed that 39% of Croatians agreed that "there is nothing wrong in a sexual relationship between two persons of the same sex", while 56% disagreed.

== See also ==
- LGBT rights in Croatia
- Recognition of same-sex unions in Europe
