= Marriage in Iran =

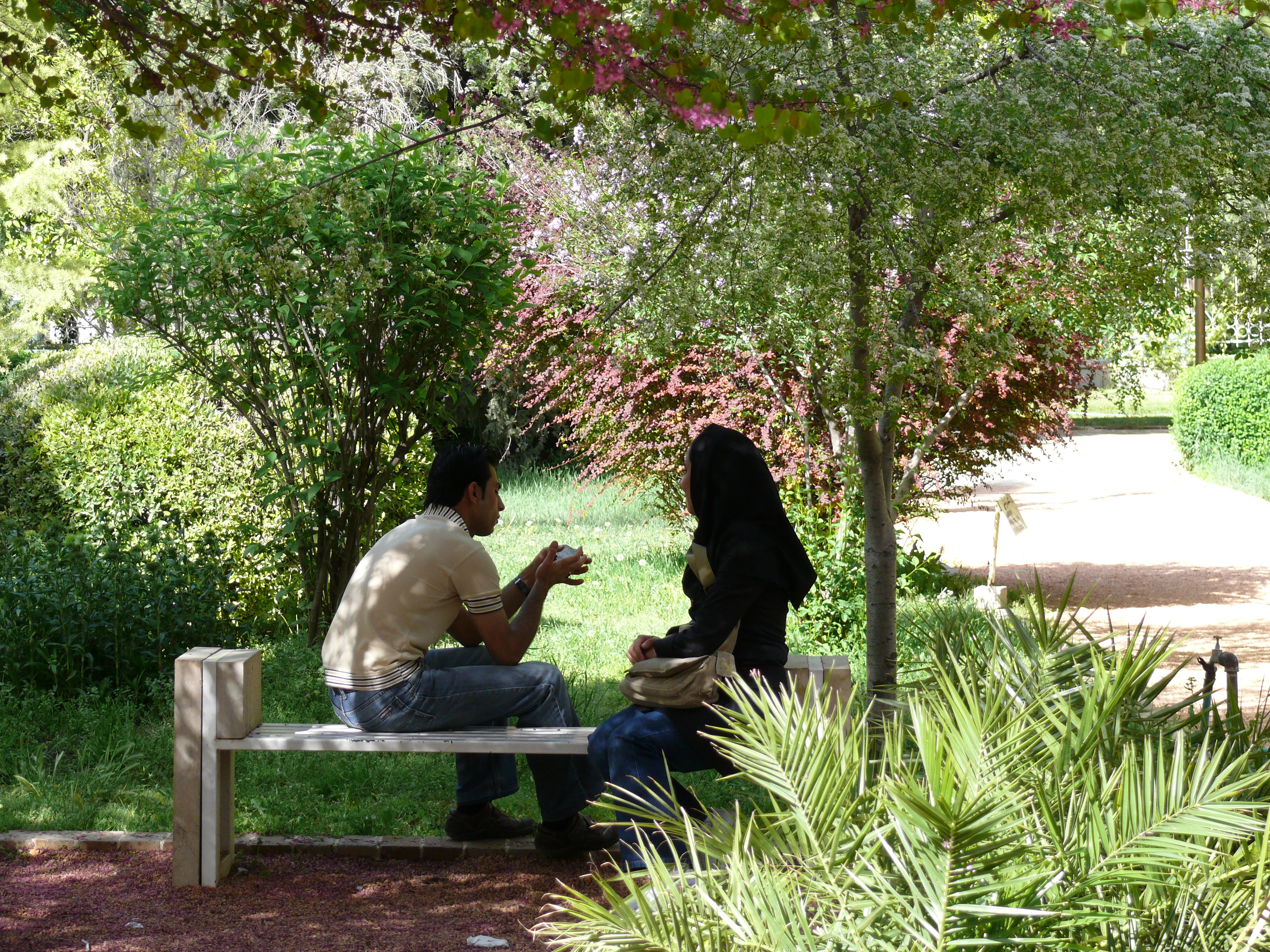
Iranian couple enjoying intimacy.

Some of the notable features regarding marriage in the Islamic Republic of Iran are a reflection of the dominant religion of the country (Twelver Shi'i Islam that more than 90% of the population adhers to), and the Iranian Islamic Revolution and its ideology that took control of the government in 1979.

Civil marriages are not recognized, marriage must be according to sharia (Islamic law). By law, women and girls are required to have the permission of their father (or paternal grandfather) to marry. Once married, they need the permission of their husband for many activities.

Marriageable age is defined at 13 years for girls and 15 years for boys, but marriage below these ages is possible with the approval of a court, in addition to the consent of the father or paternal grandfather. Pre-marriage counseling for couples is required by the Islamic Republic.

Polygamy is allowed for men, with certain conditions (e.g. legal registration). Women, on the other hand, can only marry one man at a time. Divorce is legal and can be initiated by either party. The divorce rate in Iran is relatively high, as of 2023, the divorce rate was one for every three marriages.

Historically consanguineous marriage has been popular in Iran, as a result, free genetic tests are available for marriageable men and women, and results of the tests are required to be included in marriage contract documents.

Marriages with foreigners are legal but they must be registered, and a foreign man married to an Iranian woman "will not be considered an Iranian legal citizen".

The Iranian regime disapproves of casual dating, and the law criminalises sex out of marriage, but has popularized and made convenient temporary marriage, a unique feature of Twelver Shi'i Islam.

In 2026 Iran recorded lowest birth rate in 66-70 year historic lowest record.

== Mass weddings / temp marriage booths ==
In 2026 the Iranian regime started to encourage people to marriage temporary in booths and matchmaking stalls located in all cities and arranged for mass weddings.

== Demographics and age of marriage ==
As of 2024 the mean age for marriage was 29.5 for men and 25 for women. By 2025 the mean age had risen to thirty and with declined birth rate.

As of 2025, girls in Iran can still be married at age 13 or younger with the consent of a judge and male guardian. Figures released by the Statistical Center of Iran showed that between the winter of 2021 and 2022, at least 27,448 registered marriages of girls under the age of 15 were recorded, along with 1,085 cases of childbirth within this age group. This was down from 2020 when 31,379 girls aged 10-14 were married. The number is a fraction of all marriages in Iran, (according to UNICEF data on Iran, 3% of women (20–24 years) were first married or in a union before 15 years of age, and 17% before 18 years), but still worrying, as child marriage is considered to have "widespread and long-term consequences for girls" including mental health issues, lack of access to education and career opportunities and adverse health effects.

== Encouragement to marry ==
Marriage is encouraged in Iran, and there are social pressures to marry. The government provides financial incentives for marriage and childbirth such as loans, land and matchmaking services as well as taxes on unmarried individuals. In 2024 the Iranian government started paying insurance incentives for egg freezing for females. From late March to late September 2022, Iranian banks and credit institutions were compelled by the government to make interest-free loans totaling approximately $2.6 billion USD (790 trillion rials) to encourage young people to marry and have more children. But by late 2024, a financial crisis was preventing them from providing the loans to eligible couples.

Despite government program and policies marriage rates have been historically low. 20% of all women born in Iran in 1970-80s are not in a committed relationship.

== Consanguinity ==
According to a 2024 study in Gene Cell Tissue, an estimated that in on part of Iran (southeast) 47% of marriages are with relatives (consanguineous unions). 30.2% of marriages are with first cousins. Consanguineous Marriages were most prevalent among couples younger than 20 years old, having less education, lower income, rural residence, parents who were also consanguineous and who arranged their marriage. (Multiple studies have established consanguinity as a high cause for birth defects and abnormalities. A risk of autosomal recessive disorders increases in offspring coming from consanguineous marriages due to the increased likelihood of receiving recessive genes from cognate parents.)

== Mahr ==
Wedding gifts or Mahr are a mandatory Islamic marriage practice, a substantial gift to the proposed bride promised by a husband-to-be at the time of marriage. In Iran it is usually paid through gold currency and was tax free as of 2024. Under Islamic law, a husband must pay Mahr whenever his wife requests it or when he initiates a divorce. The Mahr system was reformed in 2013 with a new law that obliged husbands to pay up to 110 gold coins (around $35,000 USD), with any additional payment conditional on the man's individual wealth.

=== Fornication and cohabiting ===
The Iranian regime strictly forbids co-habitation (white marriage). According to an 82-page report issued by Iran's parliamentary research branch, and compiled from interviews with 142,000 students, 80% of females surveyed acknowledged having premarital sex.

Virginhood female hymen checks are a controversial practice in Iran. Virginity until marriage is traditionally considered highly important by prospective husbands. To prove their virginity, many women take virginity tests. Others undergo expensive surgery to restore their hymens. Campaigners throughout Iran have called for an end to virginity testing.

== Marriage/wedding traditions ==
Persian or Iranian weddings traditions go back as far as the old Persian religion of Zoroastrianism. They take place before and after the wedding.

- Khastegāri, the traditional Iranian courtship process which may include several visits with bouquets of flowers by the visitor and tea, fruits and sweets by the hostess, or just a one-time formality to inform the parents of the decision.
- Baleh Boroon, announcement of the intention to marry.
- Shopping before the wedding day to buy rings and a "jewelry set".
- Hanā Bandān (Henna Night), a ceremony of henna skin decoration for bride-to-be and her friends, which usually takes place at the bride's house.
- Shirini Khorān, guests share tea and Iranian desserts such as bāmiyeh (light doughnut balls), nān-e berenji (rice flour cookies), chocolates, and ājil (nuts and dried fruit), following the Namzadi ceremony.
- Jahāz Barān, ceremony where presents from the bride's family are taken over to the groom's house by men from the groom's family dressed up in festive costumes.
- Wedding. Sofreh Aghd, includes an elaborate floor spread set up and with several kinds of food and decorations,
- Sofreh Aghd, similar to a bridal shower. a party with finger foods dancing and socializing.
- Pagoshā, a ceremony held in the house of the newly married couple's relatives.
- Mādarzan Salām, "hello mother in law" party, done by groom/husband.
- Mah-e Asal, (Iranian Honeymoon).

== Pleasure marriage ==
A unique feature of the dominant religion of Iran, (Shi'i Islam), is the permissibility of marriages for a fixed amount of time, known as nikah mut'ah or sigheh or "pleasure marriage". Sigheh was made into law in the Islamic Republic in 2012. Article 21 of the Family Protection Law officially sanctions the practice. According to Shokouh Mirzadegi, as of 2018, a Ministry of Tourism official reported a significant increase in Muslims from other countries coming into Iran. "Upon arriving in Iran, many of these men head directly to a 'chastity house'", (where sigheh "brides" await their business).

In Iran it reportedly costs 895.0000 ($1USD) to be getting married with a legal contract for a controlled fixed term.

== Domestic violence ==
Domestic violence in Iran remains a deeply embedded social problem, operating largely in silence due to a combination of legal gaps, cultural stigma, and institutional barriers. Iranian law has historically offered women limited protection — marital rape is not criminalized, and a husband's physical discipline of his wife exists in legal grey zones rooted in certain interpretations of Islamic jurisprudence. A domestic violence bill has been debated in the Iranian parliament for over a decade but as of recent years has never been fully passed into law, leaving victims without a dedicated legal framework for protection. Culturally, family honor and the preservation of marriage are often prioritized over a woman's safety, meaning victims face enormous pressure from family and community not to report abuse. Economic dependence on husbands — compounded by restrictions on women's employment and freedom of movement — traps many women in abusive situations with no viable exit. Shelters exist but are few, underfunded, and carry social shame. The result is a vast underreporting problem where official statistics reflect only a fraction of actual cases. Women's rights activists inside Iran have fought consistently for stronger protections but face their own persecution from the state, particularly after the 2022 Mahsa Amini uprising which brought gender-based oppression into sharp international focus. The intersection of patriarchal tradition, religious law as interpreted by the state, and political repression creates a system where domestic violence is not just tolerated but structurally enabled.

== Women's rights and male guardianship ==
Before marriage women and girls in Iran are under the legal authority of their father or another male relative (for example, requiring his permission to marry someone or to travel abroad) even after turning 18. After marriage, their husband assumes many of these legal controls; married women are legally obligated to have their husband's consent to obtain, renew, and use a passport, and a husband can revoke his prior approval at any time. Marital rape is not a crime in the Islamic Republic of Iran.

=== Inheritance ===
In the Islamic Republic, husbands generally inherit a larger share of the deceased estate than wives. If there are no children, when a married woman dies, her husband inherits half of his wife's assets, while when a man dies, his wife receives one-fourth of his assets. If the couple has children, a husband inherits one-fourth while a wife inherits one-eighth. Additionally, a son inherits twice as much as a daughter. Until 2009, women were also prohibited from inheriting land.

=== Divorce ===
A husband can divorce his wife "whenever he wishes to do so" (Art. 1133) with a few exceptions through uttering in Arabic : "زَوْجَتِی [name of wife] طالِقٌ". Nullifications of marriage contracts must be done in front of two males. In the event of a divorce, the husband (or other male relatives) take custody of the children.

According to the Center for Human Rights in Iran, "it is extraordinarily difficult" for women to get a divorce in the Islamic Republic, with onerous conditions that are often impossible to meet and are at the discretion of the deciding judge, and which result in the woman losing financial maintenance and child custody."

=== Employment ===
A husband can forbid his wife to work. According to Article 1117 of Iran's civil code, a husband can prevent his wife from occupations that he "deems against family values or inimical to his or her reputation."

=== Abortion ===
Access to abortion, contraception, voluntary sterilization services and related information is criminalized as of November 2021, under the "Youthful Population and Protection of the Family" law.

=== Sex before marriage ===
According to Article 88 of the Islamic Penal Code of Iran, the penalty for adultery (zina) for an unmarried man or woman is 100 lashes (FIDH Aug. 2003, 8). However, if the man (married or unmarried) is a non-Muslim and the woman is a Muslim, his punishment for adultery with her shall be death, according to Article 82. Legal proof of adultery is very difficult, meaning prosecution is infrequent.
