= Marriage in Spain =

Spanish legal and religious institution

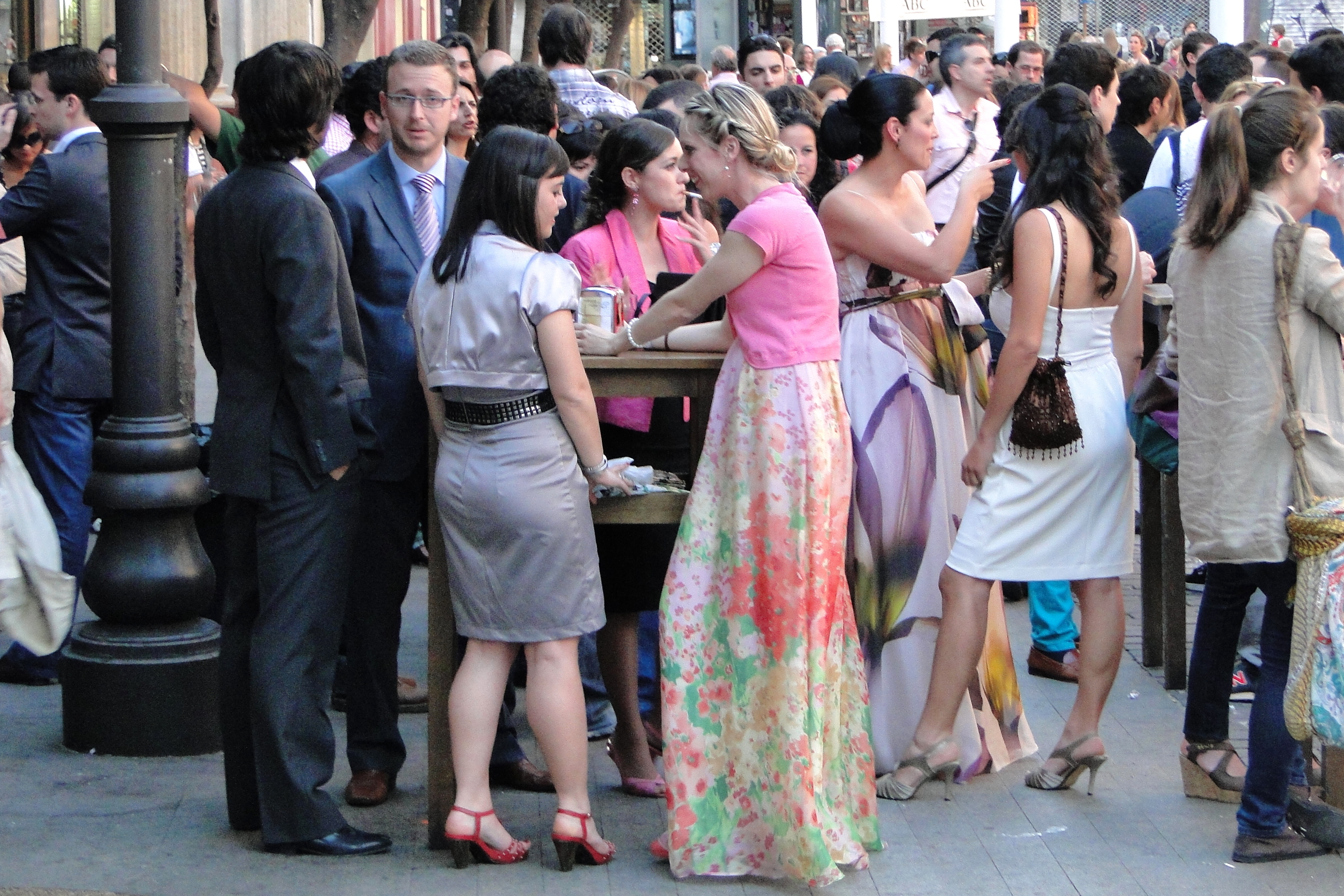
Wedding party at a tapas bar in Seville, 2010

Marriage in Spain may be contracted via the religious or civil authorities. Minors may not marry unless they are emancipated minors. Both foreigners and Spanish citizens may marry in Spain. Same-sex marriage in Spain has been recognized since 3 July 2005.
