= Marriage in Slovakia =

Marriage in Slovakia is allowed for both foreigners and residents and citizens of Slovakia, as well as between a Slovak citizen and a foreigner. Marriages between Slovak citizens performed abroad are usually recognized in Slovakia. In Slovakia, marriage is constitutionally restricted to opposite-sex couples since 2015.

Marriage may be civil or religious, but for religious marriage only ceremonies officiated by one of Slovakia's 18 state-recognized churches and religious groups are considered legally binding.
