= Marriage in France =

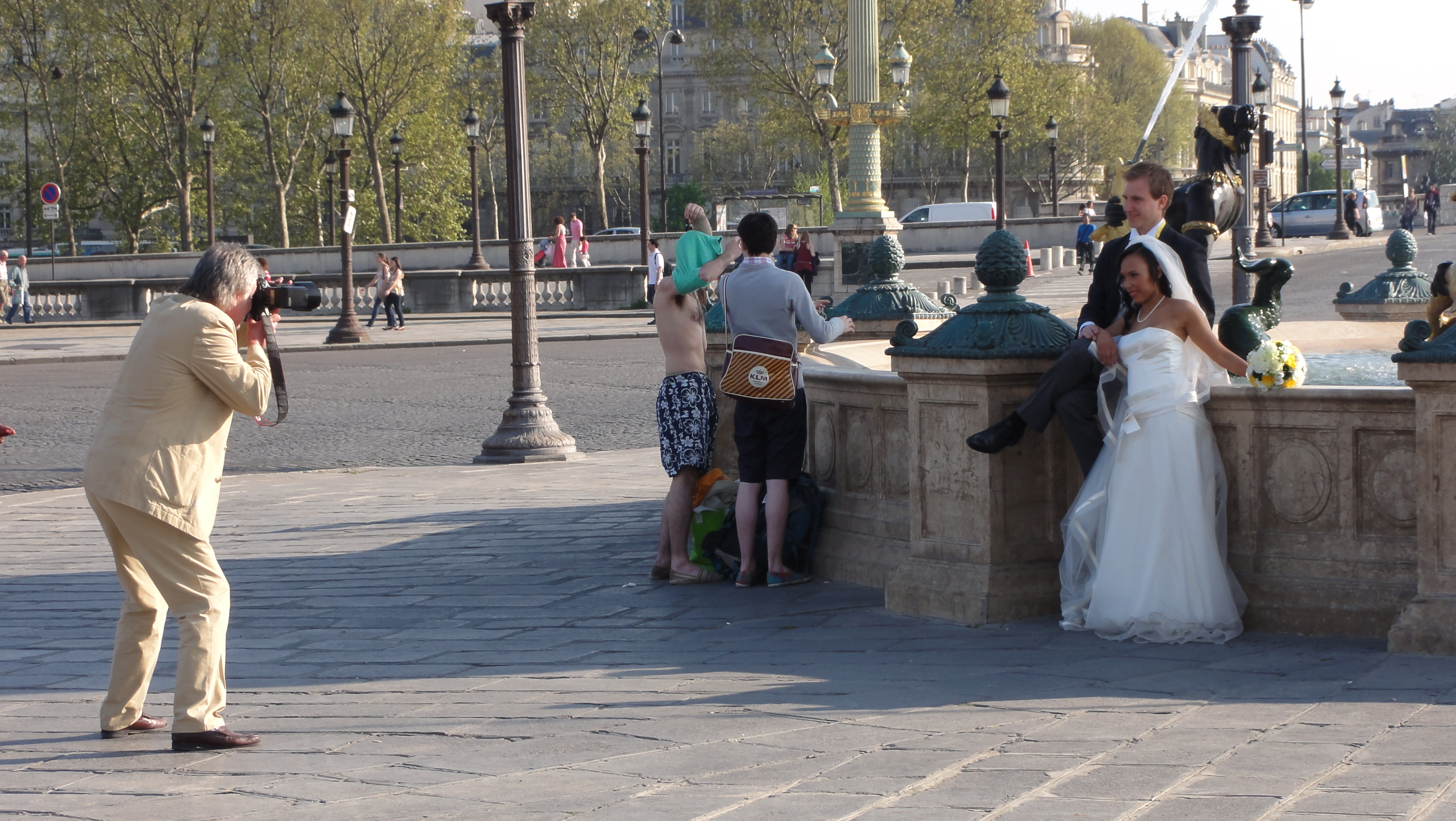
A wedded couple on the Place de la Concorde, Paris 24 April 2010

Marriage in France may be performed by civil authorities; religious weddings are not recognized by law. The minimum age to get married is 18, or 16 with parental consent.

Marriage in France is the institution that allows two people to unite to live together and start a family.

Article 143 of the Civil Code of the French (Code civil) governs civil marriage and consecrated the couple by law. Since 1999, it exists with the Rules of Cohabitation (concubinage) and the Civil Solidarity Pact (PACS).

Religious organizations that only organize religious marriages are not recognized by the law. However, after a civil marriage, couples may choose to partake in religious ceremonies if they'd like. Whoever performs the religious ceremony will generally ask for proof of a civil marriage.

== History ==
=== Roman Gaul ===
In Roman Gaul, there was a distinction made between "justae nuptiae" (just marriages) and "matrimonium non legitimum" (illegitimate marriages). For a marriage to be considered justae nuptiae, it was necessary for the consent of both parties, and for the parties involved to meet criteria, which lasted until their abolition in 212 AD, for "capacity to contract a marriage". They included the following requirements: both spouses be Roman citizens, be from specific social classes and have reached the marriageable age of twelve years for girls and fourteen years for boys. In the absence of these criteria one was in the presence of a matrimonium non legitimum which concerned slaves and foreigners.

=== Christian marriage ===
During the period of the Church Fathers (2nd to 6th centuries), there was no specific rite for marriage within the Church - Christians married according to the customs of their region. The presence of a priest was not obligatory and was rarely practiced.

Later Christians adopted the habit of having their unions blessed by their priest, but his intervention still did not make the marriage official, as it always resulted from the sole will of the spouses. Such a marriage could then be called into question at any time and when one of the spouses wanted to deny it, the other most often found it impossible to provide proof to the contrary, except when a document had been signed. Failing this, there remained only proof by witnesses.

Early on the Church prohibited divorce and sought to enforce the marital bond by surrounding its formation with solemnity and publicity. Religious marriage gradually spread from the 9th century. The spouses gave each other the sacrament of marriage in the presence of the priest who blessed their union. From the 10th century, the requirement for the public celebration of marriage became common .

From the 12th century onwards, the priest would bless the union and provide the rings, but it was not until 1215 that marriage was included in the list of the Church's sacraments. It was not until the 13th century that marriage in the Church became common practice. It is the only sacrament not to be administered by an ordained minister (priest or deacon) who, according to the provisions of canon 1108 (new Code of Canon Law, 1983 edition), is an assistant at the marriage. It is specified that "by assistant at the marriage, we mean only the person who, being present, requests the manifestation of the consent of the contracting parties, and receives it in the name of the Church" .

=== Middle Ages ===
The Roman Catholic Church was present in all aspects of life during the Middle Ages, including in marriage. Bishops had to reconcile the requirement of chastity as an ideal of perfection with the more earthly needs of humans. In the 6th century, Bishop Caesarius of Arles condemned the marital practices of the Gallo-Romans and attempted to impose periods of abstinence on his flock during Lent and in the days preceding communion. He taught that sex was only just, even within wedlock, for procreation.

The concept of marriage was also a point of friction between the Church and the Frankish warriors. The latter, although Catholic, wanted to preserve their Germanic customs – abduction, concubinage, repudiation – while the Church intended to impose the indissolubility of the couple, except in exceptional cases: incest, non-consummation of the marriage.

=== Early Modern Period ===
Since Catholic marriages were the only ones recognized by the state, the marriages of French Protestants were not legally recognized unless performed by a Catholic priest. French Protestant marriages were only recognized in 1787, with the decree for the toleration of Protestantism.

=== French Revolution ===
Civil marriage, performed by a magistrate rather than a priest, was made the only recognized form of marriage in 1792.

=== Napoleonic era ===
After France re-established slavery in 1802, France enacted laws against interracial marriage.

== See also ==
- Same-sex marriage in France
- Posthumous marriage in France
