= Marriage in Ukraine =

Marriage in Ukraine may be performed as a religious ceremony and, since the Russian Revolution in 1917, a civil ceremony. The minimum legal age at which someone can be married is 18 for men and women, although it was previously 17 for girls. The Family Code of Ukraine in 2012 raised the minimum age for girls to 18; however, courts may grant permission to children from the age of 16 if marriage can be established as being in their interest. No legal status exists for couples cohabitating or those married in religious-only ceremonies, as all marriages must be registered at the state civil registry office. Marriage cannot take place between close relatives or to a person who has been declared mentally ill or incompetent.

During the 1920s, a woman would spend an average of 29 years as a married wife, though with the subsequent growth in divorces, coupled with male deaths from World War II, this had decreased to 25.6 years by the late 1950s. The average gradually increased over the following decades, reaching 31.3 years by 1979.

== Child marriage ==
Child marriages are rare in Ukraine and have seen significant falls since the 1970s. Data from 2012 suggested that 11 percent of surveyed women between the ages of 20 and 49 were first married before they turned 18, although this figure was slightly higher for rural areas, at 14.5 percent. Women are more likely to enter marriage earlier than 18 compared to men. In Ukraine, the stereotypical view is that marriage for Ukrainian women is important, and younger people generally support the idea of marrying at a young age.

== See also ==
- Same-sex marriage in Ukraine
