= Marriage in Turkey =

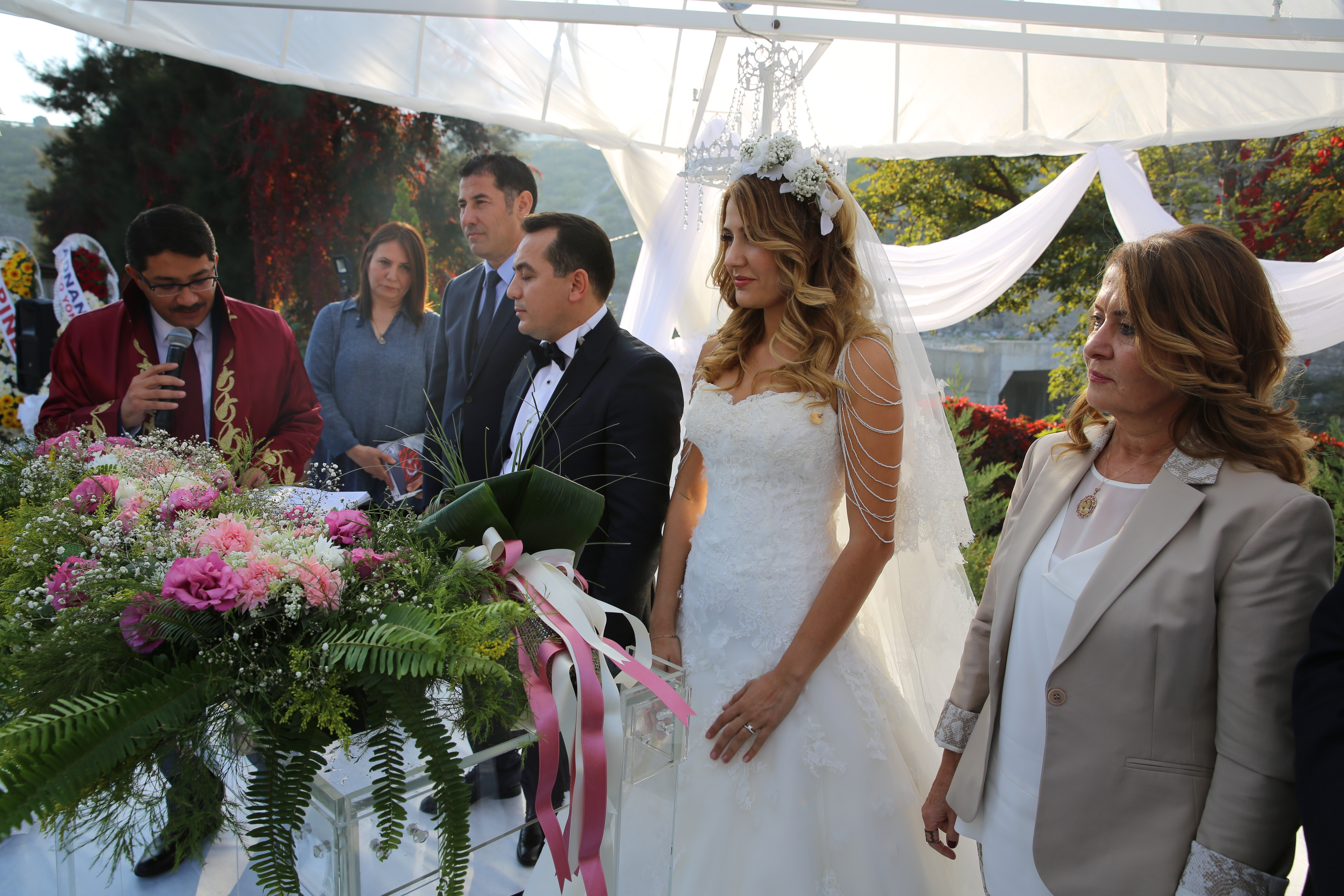
Wedding in Manisa in 2015

Marriage in Turkey may be performed by civil officials or by Muslim clerics (since 2017), although only civil marriage is recognized. The legal age for marriage is 18 although 17-year-olds can marry with parental permission, and 16-year-olds with both parental permission and a court decision.

== Same-sex marriage ==
Same-sex marriage is not recognized in Turkey; according to a 2015 Ipsos survey, 27 percent of the population supports it.

== Marriage in Turkey for Foreigners ==
In Turkey, foreign nationals are legally permitted to marry in accordance with Turkish civil law, regardless of their nationality or country of residence, provided that they meet the applicable legal requirements, and marriages performed by authorized Turkish marriage officers are fully valid under Turkish law; as a result, a Turkish marriage certificate issued after a civil marriage is an official state document that is generally recognized internationally and can be used in other countries when properly legalized or apostilled in accordance with international conventions, making Turkey a widely used jurisdiction for international couples seeking a legally secure and globally acknowledged marriage.
