= Marriage in Poland =

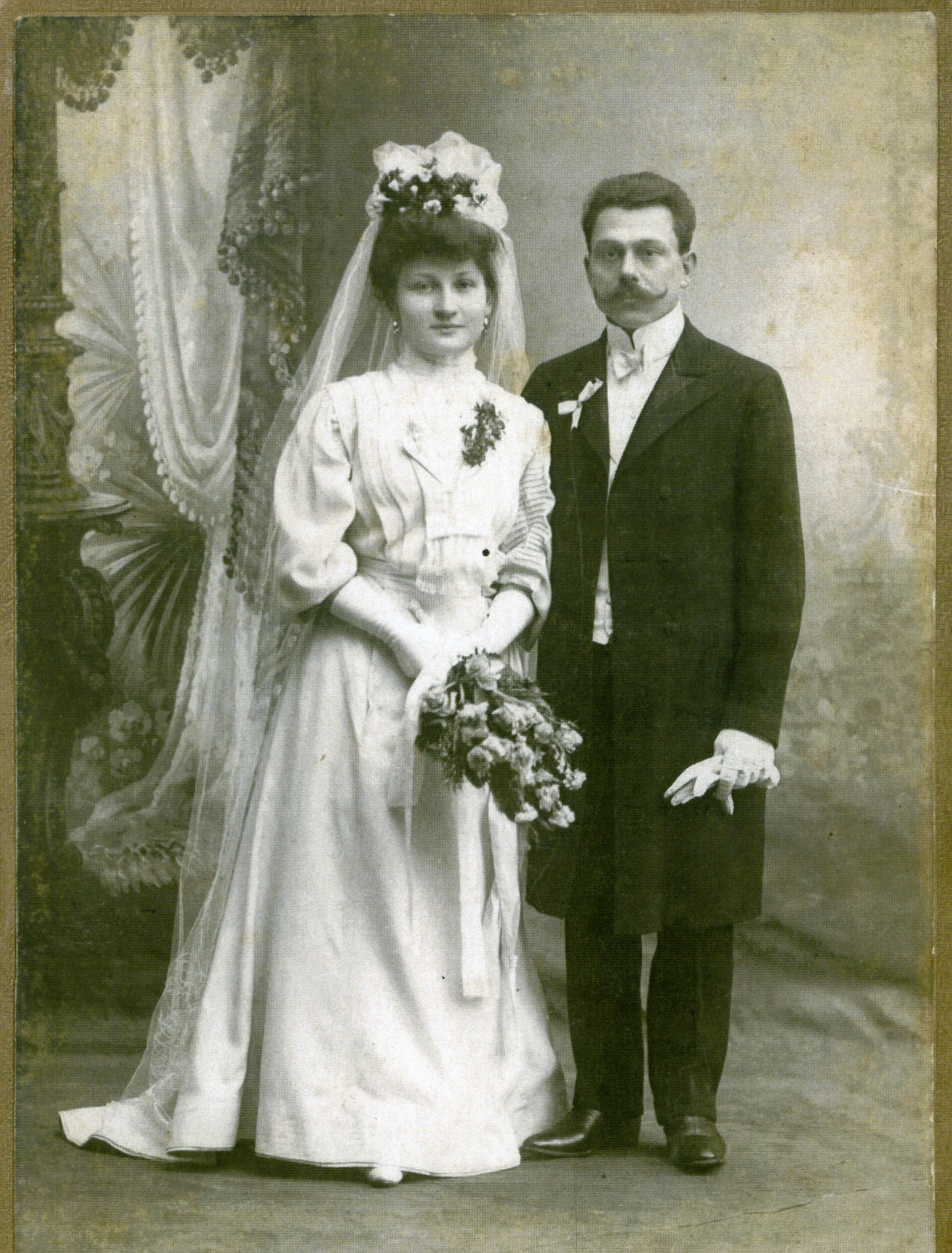
1905 wedding in Poland

Marriage in Poland may be performed as a civil or religious ceremony. The normal legal minimum age to marry is 18, however, women 16 or older may seek family court's permission to marry before turning 18 under exceptional circumstances. Same-sex marriage is not recognized in Poland and some claim it is forbidden by the Constitution of Poland.

== Legal basis ==
According to Polish law, marriage is concluded when two unmarried persons of opposite sex make a mutual declaration (marriage oath) of their intention to become married, provided that they do so simultaneously in the presence of a registrar of the Civil Registry Office (urząd stanu cywilnego). Alternatively, a couple may choose to marry under the internal law of their chosen religious denomination, they may make the declaration in presence of a clergy member, express their will to simultaneously enter into a civil marriage, and the registrar of the Civil Registry Office subsequently prepared the marriage certificate.
