= Marriage in Germany =

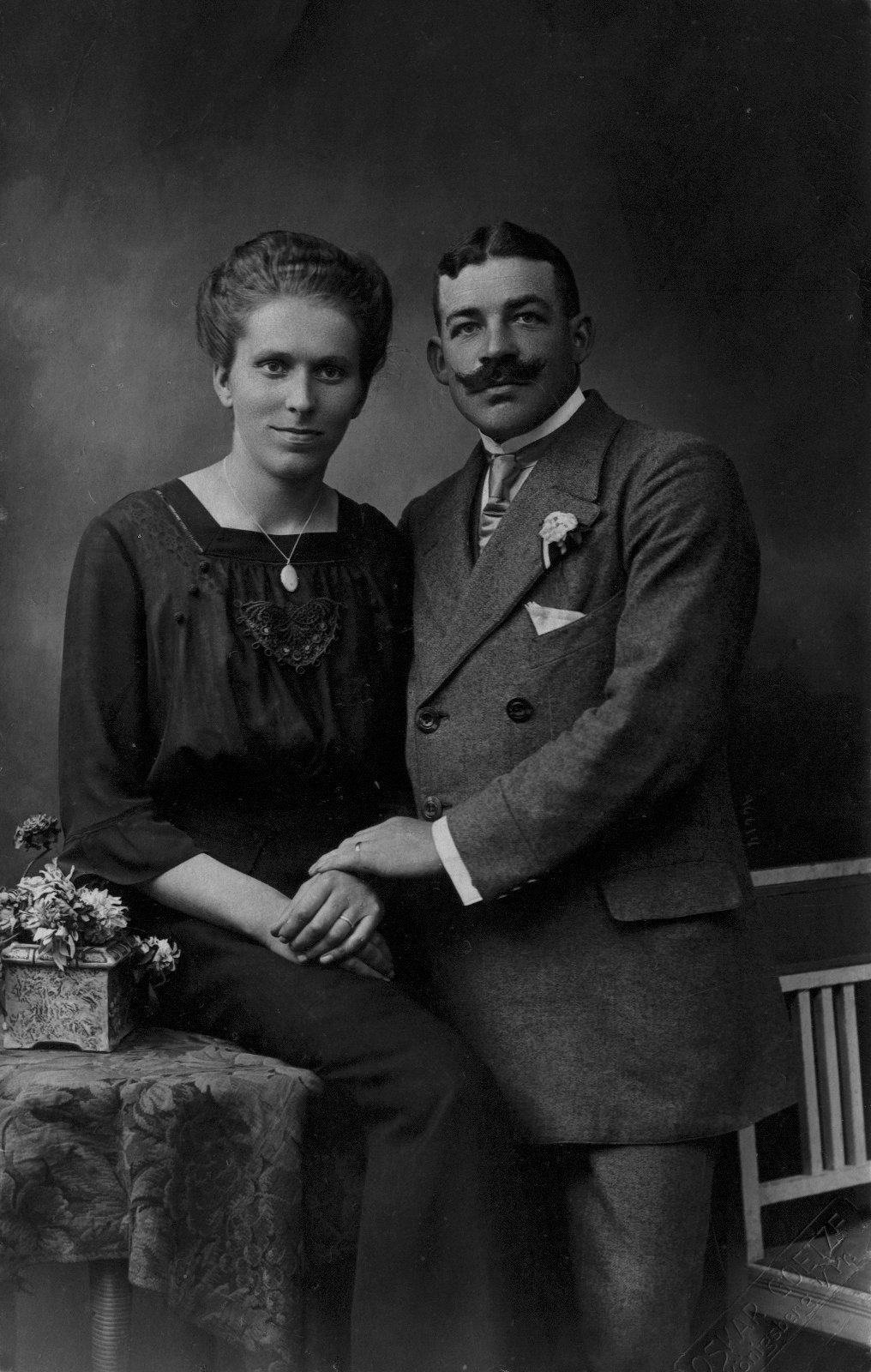
German couple who married in 1920

Marriage in Germany is governed by the Bürgerliches Gesetzbuch in sections 1297 to 1588 of the fourth book of the code as a branch of family law. Marriage may only be conducted by a civil registrar, although couples may also participate in religious ceremonies. People who are not citizens or residents may marry in Germany. Since 1 October 2017, same-sex couples may marry.

== Statistics ==
Almost 10 million married couples lived without children, about 6.5 million couples had at least one child under the age of 18. At the end of 2022, 49 percent of German adult population was married.

Year	Number of marriages	Marriage rate (per 1,000)
1950	750,452	10.8
1951	718,166	10.3
1952	659,779	9.4
1953	620,121	8.8
1954	605,392	8.5
1955	617,228	8.7
1956	630,932	8.9
1957	632,659	8.9
1958	648,471	9.0
1959	665,844	9.2
1960	689,028	9.4
1961	699,339	9.5
1962	696,317	9.4
1963	655,974	8.7
1964	642,037	8.5
1965	621,130	8.1
1966	606,133	7.9
1967	600,247	7.8
1968	563,826	7.3
1969	571,737	7.3
1970	575,233	7.4
1971	562,235	7.2
1972	548,707	7.0
1973	532,022	6.7
1974	516,081	6.5
1975	528,811	6.7
1976	510,318	6.5
1977	505,889	6.5
1978	469,278	6.0
1979	481,707	6.2
1980	496,603	6.3
1981	487,832	6.2
1982	486,856	6.2
1983	495,392	6.4
1984	498,040	6.4
1985	496,175	6.4
1986	509,320	6.5
1987	523,847	6.7
1988	534,903	6.8
1989	529,597	6.7
1990	516,388	6.5
1991	454,291	5.7
1992	453,428	5.6
1993	442,605	5.4
1994	440,244	5.4
1995	430,534	5.3
1996	427,297	5.2
1997	422,776	5.2
1998	417,420	5.1
1999	430,674	5.2
2000	418,550	5.1
2001	389,591	4.7
2002	391,963	4.7
2003	382,911	4.6
2004	395,992	4.8
2005	388,451	4.7
2006	373,681	4.5
2007	368,922	4.5
2008	377,055	4.6
2009	378,439	4.6
2010	382,047	4.7
2011	377,816	4.7
2012	387,423	4.8
2013	373,655	4.6
2014	385,952	4.8
2015	400,115	4.9
2016	410,426	5.0
2017	407,466	4.9
2018	449,466	5.4
2019	416,324	5.0
2020	373,304	4.5
2021	357,785	4.3
2022	390,743	4.7
2023	360,979	4.3
2024	349,221	4.2

=== Marriages between German and foreigner ===
Of the total of around 21 million married couples in Germany in 2005, 6.3 percent were international (compared to 1996 an increase of 3% to 1.3 million). With 602,000 married couples, the wife is of foreign origin (for 545,000 the husband). In the case of unmarried couples each consisting of a foreigner and a German national, the number of foreign men prevails over the number of foreign women (104,000 to 80,000). The ratio of partners from EU countries to partners from non-EU countries is around 2:3. 45,915 international marriages, in which one of the partners has a German passport and the other a foreign passport, were concluded in Germany in 2015, that is 11.5% of all new marriages or every 9th Married couple. Almost two generations before, in 1960, in the old Federal Republic, only every 27th fresh couple was international (3.7%).

Marriages	2024	2023	2022	2021	2020	2019
Female German, Male Foreigner	18,122	18,547	19,382	18,639	16,849	20,968
Male German, Female Foreigner	21,542	21,890	22,769	22,665	21,373	25,604
Male German, Male Foreigner	861	829	905	891	928	1,279
Female German, Female Foreigner	407	396	411	386	354	496
