= Marriage in Austria =

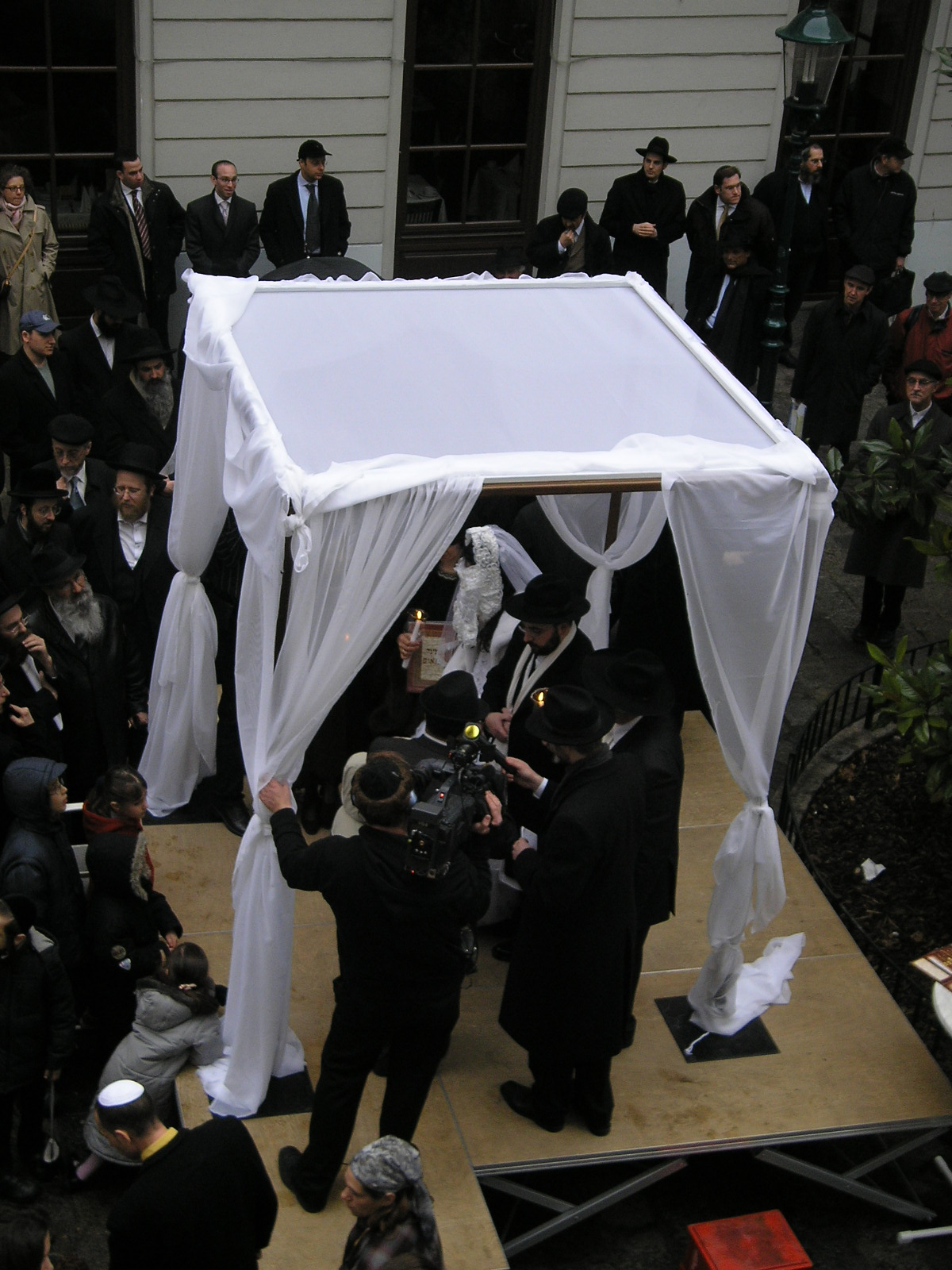
Jewish wedding in Vienna, January 2007

Marriage in Austria is only performed by civil ceremonies; religious ceremonies are allowed but have no legal status. The minimum age of marriage is 16 with parental consent or 18 without. Both Austrian citizens and non-citizens may marry in Austria. Same-sex marriage in Austria is recognized since 1 January 2019.
