= Marriage in the Czech Republic =

Ceremony in Czech republic

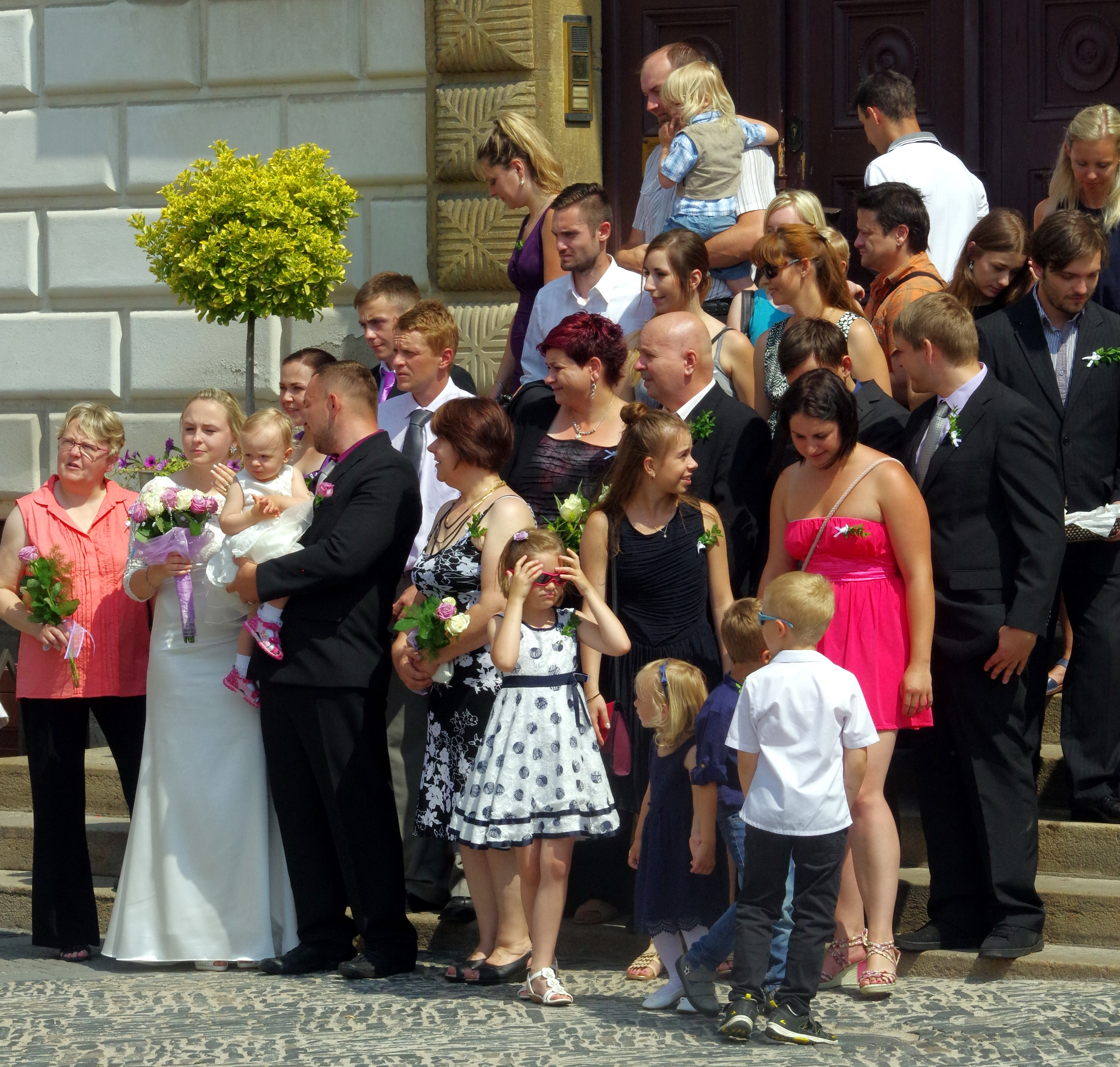
Wedding ceremony in Kolín, 2016

Marriage in the Czech Republic can be performed in a religious or civil ceremony. It may be performed between Czech citizens, a Czech citizen and a foreigner, or two foreign nationals. Both partners must be at least 18 years old. Same-sex marriage is not currently recognized in the Czech Republic as of 2020.
