= Marriage in Croatia =

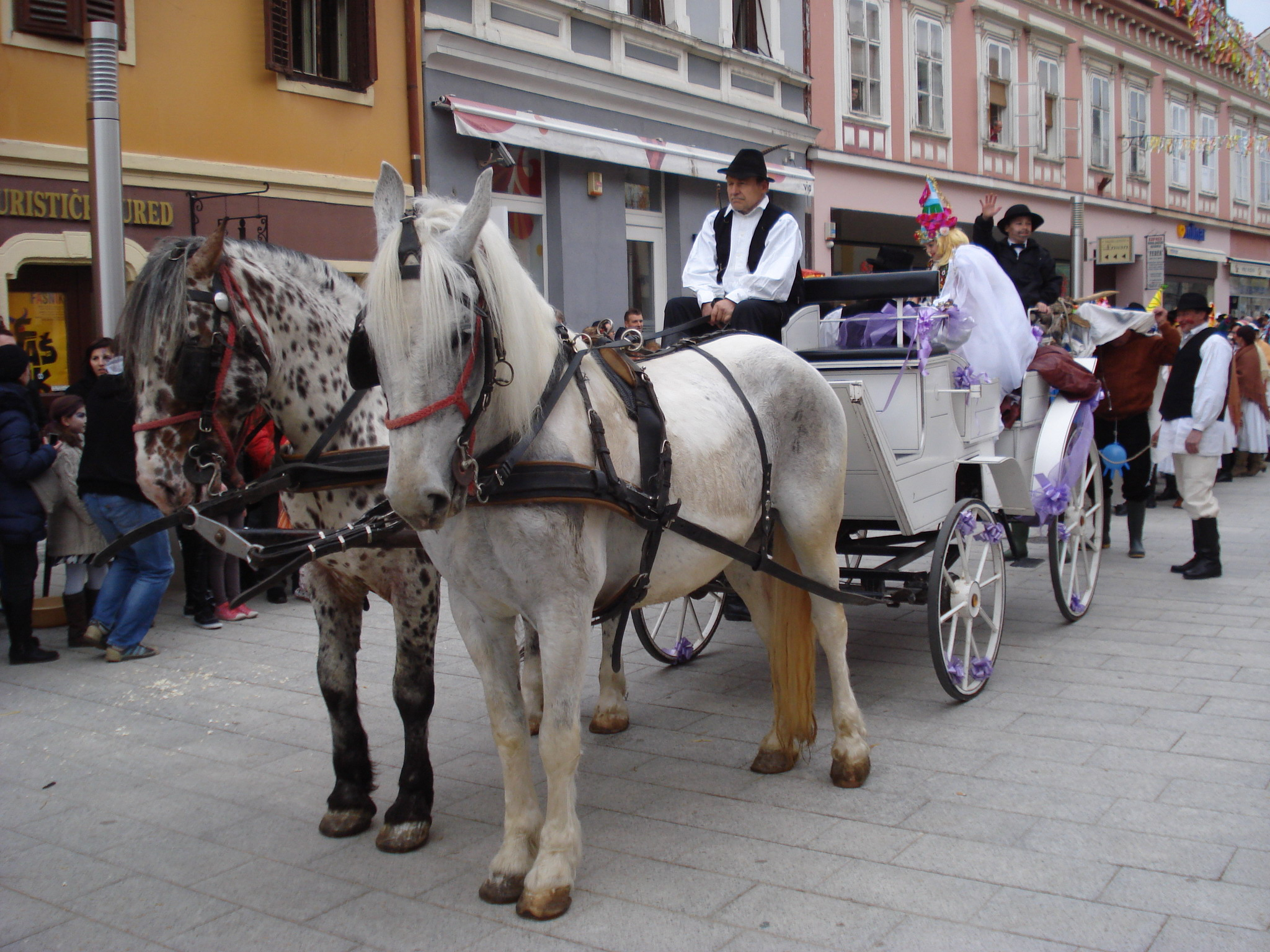
People dressed up as newlyweds in a carriage at the Međimurje Carnival in 2014

Marriage in Croatia is a legally regulated union of life between a woman and a man. Marriage is regulated by the Family Act.

There are two types of ways to contract a marriage in Croatia: civil and religious. The bride and groom must be of different sexes and must consent to the marriage for it to be valid. They also must be over 18 (or 16 with court approval), cannot be incapable of judgement, cannot be related and cannot already be married.

== History ==
In medieval Europe, the prevailing understanding was that marriage is a sacrament, and it was therefore subjected to the regulation of canon law and ecclesiastical jurisdiction. The proclamation of marriage as a sacrament led to the principle of the indissolubility of the marital bond during the lifetime of the husband and wife under canon marriage law, contrary to the position of Roman law. Under earlier canon law, marriage arose from the declaration of will of the betrothed, and a church wedding was not required for its validity. However, at the Council of Trent in 1563, the decree Tametsi established that consent to marriage had to be declared before the parish priest of the residence of one of the betrothed and before two witnesses.

Croatia was ruled by the Austrian Empire and followed its marriage laws. With the Josephine Marriage Patent of 1783 and the General Civil Code of 1811, civil jurisdiction over the regulation of marriage was introduced, although church weddings remained the mandatory form for contracting marriage. However, a new concordat with the Holy See in 1855 restored the Catholic Church's dominant role in marriage law, establishing mandatory religious marriage for Catholics and giving church courts exclusive authority over marital matters.

When Austria-Hungary was established in 1867, Hungary revoked the concordat, and Austria reverted to the arrangement from the Josephine era. Hungary introduced mandatory civil marriage through Act 31 of 1894.

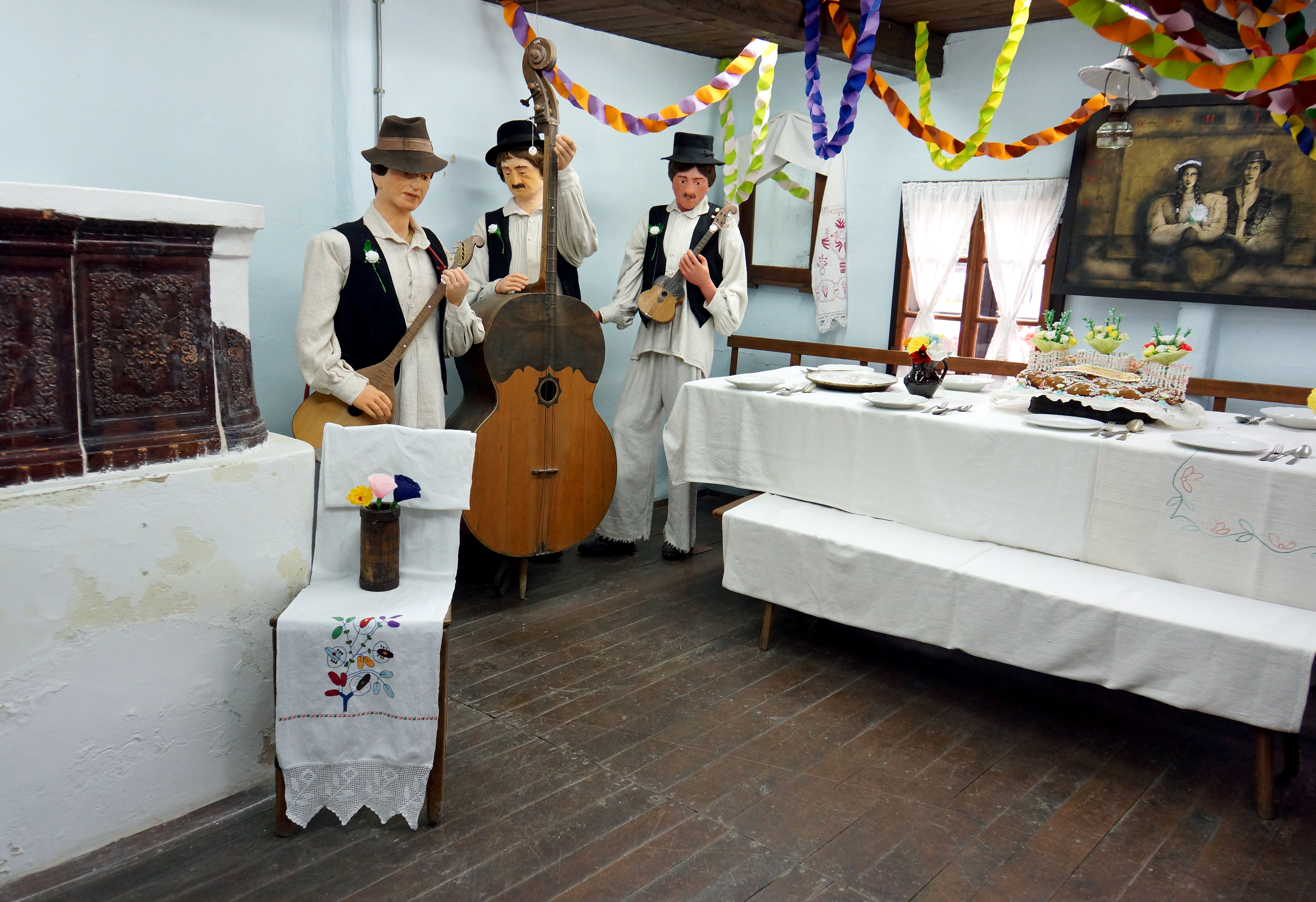
An exhibition in Kumrovec showing a band performing at a 19th century peasant wedding

In 1946, the Yugoslav Constitution and the Basic Marriage Act introduced mandatory civil marriage as marriage was now required to be contracted before a competent state authority.

After the Independence of Croatia, changes to marriage came about stemming primarily from the Decision of the Constitutional Court of Croatia (of 16 February 1994), and subsequently from the Agreement between the Holy See and the Republic of Croatia on Legal Issues. The Constitutional Court's decision struck down Article 27 of the Marriage and Family Relations Act, thereby abolishing the legal prohibition on holding a religious wedding ceremony before the marriage had been contracted before a representative of the competent state authority. Through the Agreement with the Holy See, the state effectively committed to introducing optional, rather than mandatory, civil marriage, given that a special regulation (Article 13, paragraph 1) allows religious marriage to have civil legal effects.

== Contracting ==
Marriage is contracted with the statement of consent of a woman and a man. There are two types of ways to contract a marriage: civil and religious. In the civil form, marriage is contracted in the presence of the bride and the groom, a registrar and two witnesses who must be competent adults. In a religious form, with the effects of a civil marriage, a marriage is contracted before an official of a religious community that has regulated legal relations with Croatia in this regard. The law recognizes the effects of civil marriage, or of religious marriage on condition that the requirements prescribed by law were fulfilled at the time the marriage was contracted.

=== Conditions ===
For the existence of a marriage the following are necessary:

1. that the bride and the groom are of different sexes
2. that the bride and the groom have stated their consent to the contracting of marriage
3. that the marriage in a civil form has been contracted before a registrar or that a marriage in a religious form has been contracted according to the provisions of Article 13 Paragraph 3 and Article 20 Paragraphs 1 and 4 of the Family Act.

For a marriage to be valid the following are necessary:

1. A person must be over 18 years of age, although by court decision they may also be 16
2. A person cannot be deemed incapable of judgement, although by court decision can marry with the consent of a guardian
3. The bride and groom cannot be blood relatives in the direct line, and in the collateral line cannot be: sister and brother, half-sister and half-brother, a child with the sister, half-sister, brother, or half-brother of their parent, or the children of siblings and half-siblings
4. A person cannot already be in a marriage or in a same-sex life partnership

== Demographics ==
In 2025, 17,270 marriages were contracted in Croatia while the marriage rate (marriages per 1,000 inhabitants) was 4.5. There were 5,674 divorces while the divorce rate (divorces per 1 000 inhabitants) was 1.5. The number of divorces per 1,000 marriages amounted to 328.5.

=== By year ===
	Average population	Marriages	Divorces	Crude marriage rate (per 1000)	Crude divorce rate (per 1000)	Divorces per 1000 marriages
1950	3,850,991	38,163	3,137	9.9	0.8	82.2
1951	3,881,986	35,079	2,947	9.0	0.8	84.0
1952	3,912,983	39,492	3,175	10.1	0.8	80.4
1953	3,945,997	37,022	3,924	9.4	1.0	106.0
1954	3,978,125	40,715	3,854	10.2	1.0	94.7
1955	4,013,015	39,219	4,499	9.8	1.1	114.7
1956	4,039,992	38,677	4,419	9.6	1.1	114.3
1957	4,067,005	36,627	4,746	9.0	1.2	129.6
1958	4,088,987	37,359	5,272	9.1	1.3	141.1
1959	4,114,979	36,651	5,053	8.9	1.2	137.9
1960	4,140,181	36,761	4,811	8.9	1.2	130.9
1961	4,167,292	36,634	5,057	8.8	1.2	138.0
1962	4,196,712	36,149	4,883	8.6	1.2	135.1
1963	4,225,675	33,976	5,114	8.0	1.2	150.5
1964	4,252,876	35,965	5,217	8.5	1.2	145.1
1965	4,280,923	38,474	5,663	9.0	1.3	147.2
1966	4,310,701	36,896	5,390	8.6	1.3	146.1
1967	4,338,683	35,815	4,861	8.3	1.1	135.7
1968	4,365,628	35,447	4,891	8.1	1.1	138.0
1969	4,391,490	35,466	5,474	8.1	1.2	154.3
1970	4,412,252	37,319	5,333	8.5	1.2	142.9
1971	4,431,275	37,701	5,427	8.5	1.2	143.9
1972	4,450,564	37,779	5,567	8.5	1.3	147.4
1973	4,470,161	36,967	5,781	8.3	1.3	156.4
1974	4,490,660	36,034	6,331	8.0	1.4	175.7
1975	4,512,082	36,290	5,928	8.0	1.3	163.4
1976	4,535,934	35,019	6,099	7.7	1.3	174.2
1977	4,559,571	35,524	5,511	7.8	1.2	155.1
1978	4,581,085	35,629	5,959	7.8	1.3	167.3
1979	4,594,778	34,041	5,036	7.4	1.1	147.9
1980	4,599,782	33,310	5,342	7.2	1.2	160.4
1981	4,611,509	33,855	5,704	7.3	1.2	168.5
1982	4,634,234	33,143	5,355	7.2	1.2	161.6
1983	4,658,254	33,135	5,263	7.1	1.1	158.8
1984	4,680,285	32,161	5,295	6.9	1.1	164.6
1985	4,701,417	30,953	5,375	6.6	1.1	173.7
1986	4,721,446	30,495	5,946	6.5	1.3	195.0
1987	4,739,745	31,395	5,577	6.6	1.2	177.6
1988	4,755,207	29,719	5,647	6.2	1.2	190.0
1989	4,767,260	28,938	5,369	6.1	1.1	185.5
1990	4,777,368	27,924	5,466	5.8	1.1	195.7
1991	4,733,938	21,583	4,877	4.6	1.0	226.0
1992	4,690,509	22,169	3,676	4.7	0.8	165.8
1993	4,647,079	23,021	4,667	5.0	1.0	202.7
1994	4,603,649	23,966	4,630	5.2	1.0	193.2
1995	4,560,220	24,385	4,236	5.3	0.9	173.7
1996	4,516,790	24,596	3,612	5.4	0.8	146.9
1997	4,473,361	24,517	3,899	5.5	0.9	159.0
1998	4,429,931	24,243	3,962	5.5	0.9	163.4
1999	4,386,501	23,778	3,721	5.4	0.8	156.5
2000	4,343,072	22,017	4,419	5.1	1.0	200.7
2001	4,299,642	22,076	4,670	5.1	1.1	211.5
2002	4,302,174	22,806	4,496	5.3	1.0	197.1
2003	4,303,399	22,337	4,934	5.2	1.1	220.9
2004	4,304,600	22,700	4,985	5.3	1.2	219.6
2005	4,310,145	22,138	4,883	5.1	1.1	220.6
2006	4,311,159	22,092	4,651	5.1	1.1	210.5
2007	4,310,217	23,140	4,785	5.4	1.1	206.8
2008	4,309,705	23,373	5,025	5.4	1.2	215.0
2009	4,305,181	22,382	5,076	5.2	1.2	226.8
2010	4,295,427	21,294	5,058	5.0	1.2	237.5
2011	4,280,622	20,211	5,662	4.7	1.3	280.1
2012	4,260,368	20,323	5,659	4.8	1.3	278.5
2013	4,233,922	19,169	5,992	4.5	1.4	312.6
2014	4,201,598	19,501	6,570	4.6	1.6	336.9
2015	4,151,725	19,834	6,010	4.7	1.4	303.0
2016	4,106,867	20,467	7,036	4.9	1.7	343.8
2017	4,041,407	20,310	6,265	4.9	1.5	308.5
2018	3,988,775	19,921	6,125	4.9	1.5	307.5
2019	3,949,390	19,761	5,936	5.0	1.5	300.4
2020	3,914,206	15,196	5,153	3.9	1.3	339.1
2021	3,878,981	18,203	5,100	4.7	1.3	280.2
2022	3,855,641	18,074	4,808	4.7	1.3	266.0
2023	3,859,686	17,306	4,407	4.5	1.1	254.7
2024	3,866,233	17,206	4,961	4.5	1.3	288.3
2025	3,875,000	17,270	5,674	4.5	1.5	328.5

=== By county ===
	Marriages	Divorces	Divorces per 1000 marriages
Zagreb	1,456	478	328.3
Krapina-Zagorje	489	196	400.82
Sisak-Moslavina	558	232	415.77
Karlovac	400	169	422.5
Varaždin	588	211	358.84
Koprivnica-Križevci	460	168	365.22
Bjelovar-Bilogora	461	173	375.27
Primorje-Gorski Kotar	956	309	323.22
Lika-Senj	149	55	369.13
Virovitica-Podravina	344	133	386.63
Požega-Slavonia	331	92	277.95
Brod-Posavina	703	172	244.67
Zadar	816	159	194.85
Osijek-Baranja	1,230	447	363.41
Šibenik-Knin	393	80	203.56
Vukovar-Srijem	761	252	331.14
Split-Dalmatia	2,078	611	294.03
Istria	708	89	125.71
Dubrovnik-Neretva	537	105	195.53
Međimurje	369	129	349.59
City of Zagreb	3,483	1,414	405.97
Croatia	17,270	5,674	328.55
