= Russian wedding traditions =

Russian wedding culture

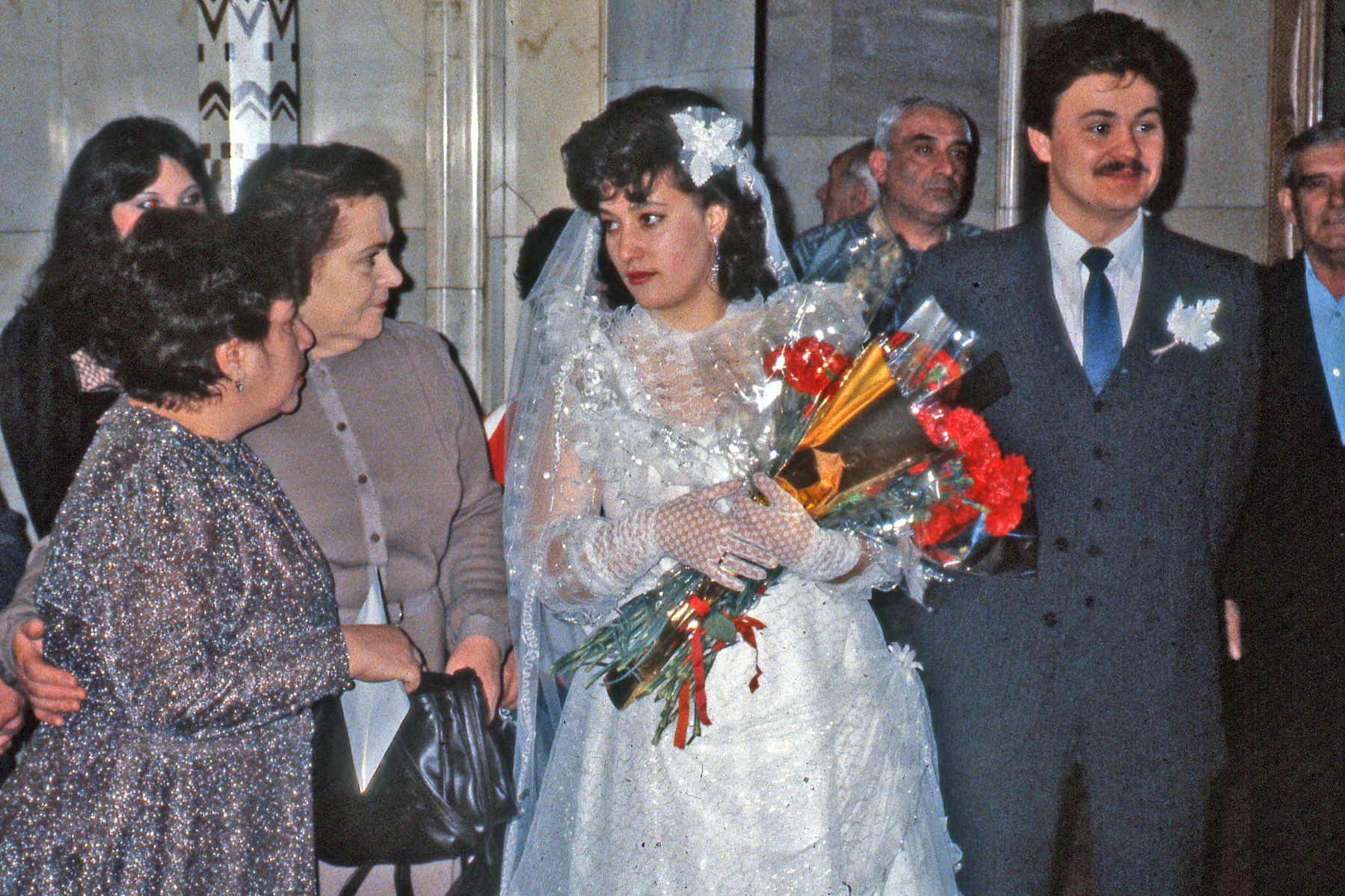
Wedding party in the Praga Hotel, Moscow, 1990

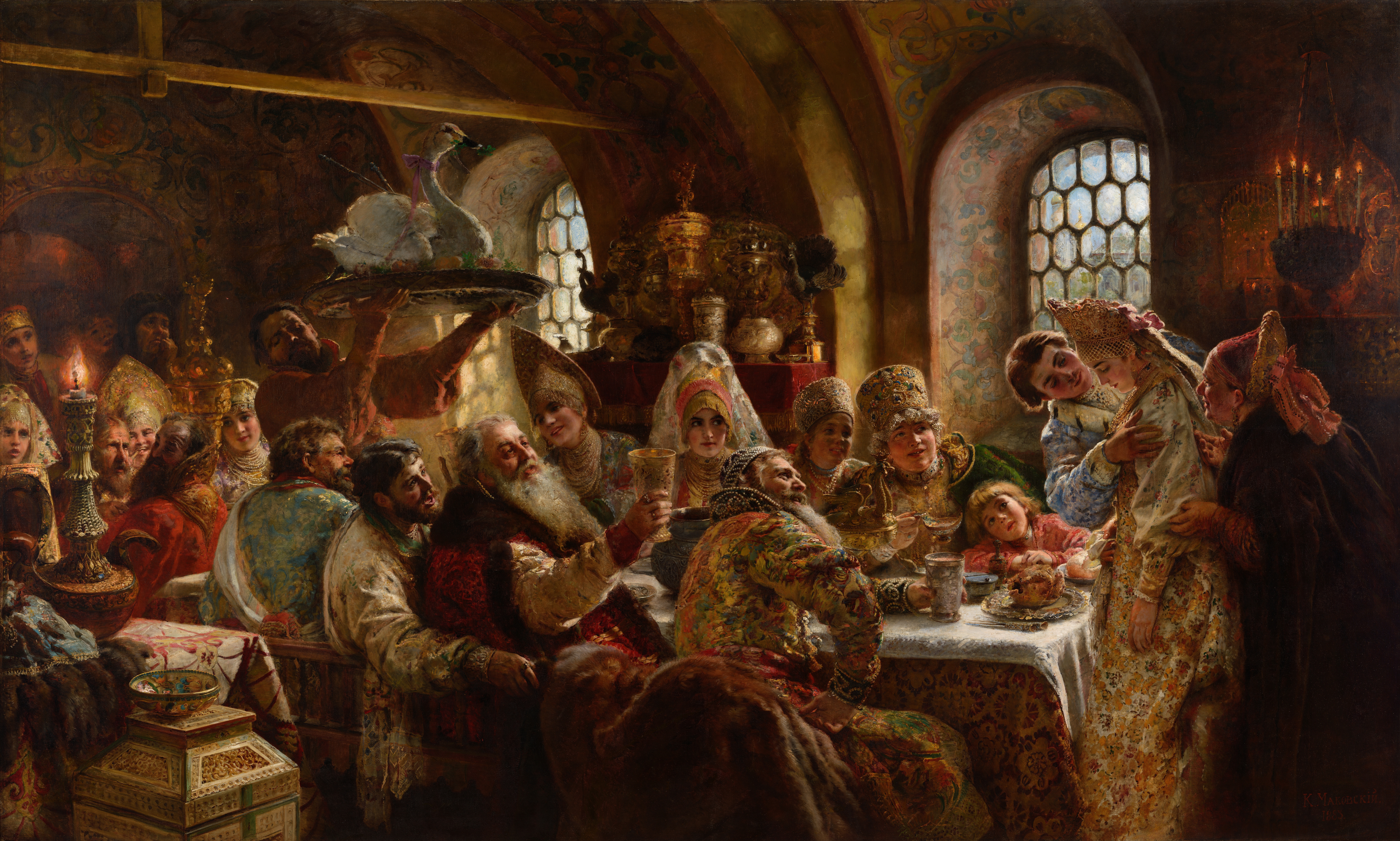
A Boyar Wedding Feast by Konstantin Makovsky, 1883

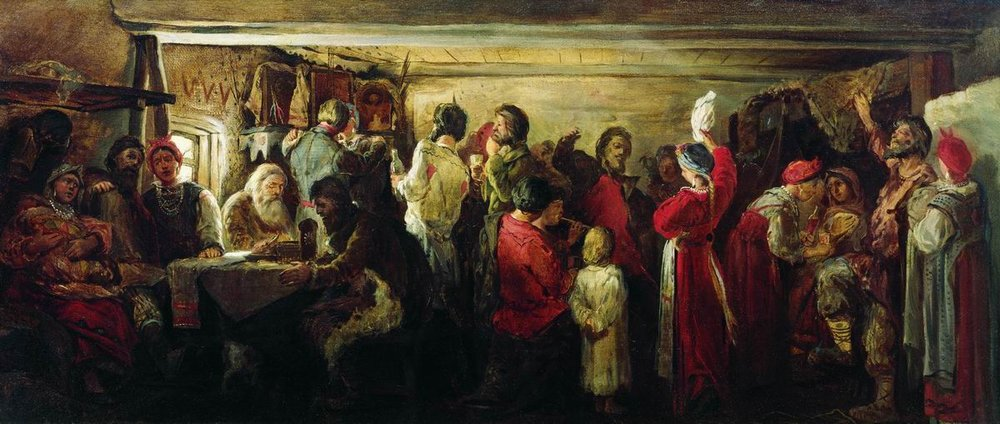
Peasant Wedding in the Tambov guberniya, 1880

Russian weddings held great importance in their culture and tradition, evolving differently according the region, but maintaining common points. They can last between two days and one week usually involving activities like dancing, singing, toasting, and banqueting. The best man and bridesmaid are called "Witnesses" or "Свидетели" (svideteli) in Russian. The ceremony and the ring exchange take place on the first day of the wedding. Russian weddings ceremonies have undertaken a certain amount of Western traditions, including incorporating maids of honour into the wedding party.

== Traditional wedding rituals ==
At the ceremony the engaged will receive their rings given by a couple of married friends, being that the wife of the friends couple puts first the ring on the bride, only then proceeding his husband with the fiance.

=== Paying the ransom ===
Once the groom arrives at the bride's home, he must pay a ransom for the bride. Meant to be comical and entertaining, it starts with the groom bringing an offering of money or jewelry for the bride. At this point, the bride's parents present a woman or man who is not the bride, but is veiled so the groom cannot see the face. When the groom realizes it is not his bride, he asks for her, but the bride's family will demand a more significant ransom to be paid. Upon satisfaction with the ransom given, the bride's family gives away the actual bride to the groom.

=== Religious ceremony ===
The bride and groom have the option to have a traditional ceremony in a church. It is divided into two parts: the Betrothal and the Crowning. The service traditionally takes place in the morning after the celebration of the Divine Liturgy, during which the wedding rings are blessed by a priest by being placed on an altar.

==== Betrothal ====
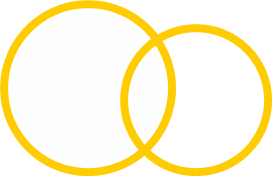
Two golden rings are a symbol of marriage, and are commonly used on wedding invitations.

While the Betrothal used to be blessed at the beginning of the engagement, it is now commonly done immediately preceding the wedding itself.

The bride and groom stand at the entrance of the church and the priest blesses them and gives each a lit candle to hold throughout the ceremony. The deacon leads an ektenia (litany) with special petitions for the couple. The priest then says two brief prayers for the couple, then blesses the rings that are then placed on the couple's right hands.

The priest then says a prayer to bless the Betrothal, which mentions instances in the Bible where rings are used and relate those instances to the Betrothal.

==== Crowning ====
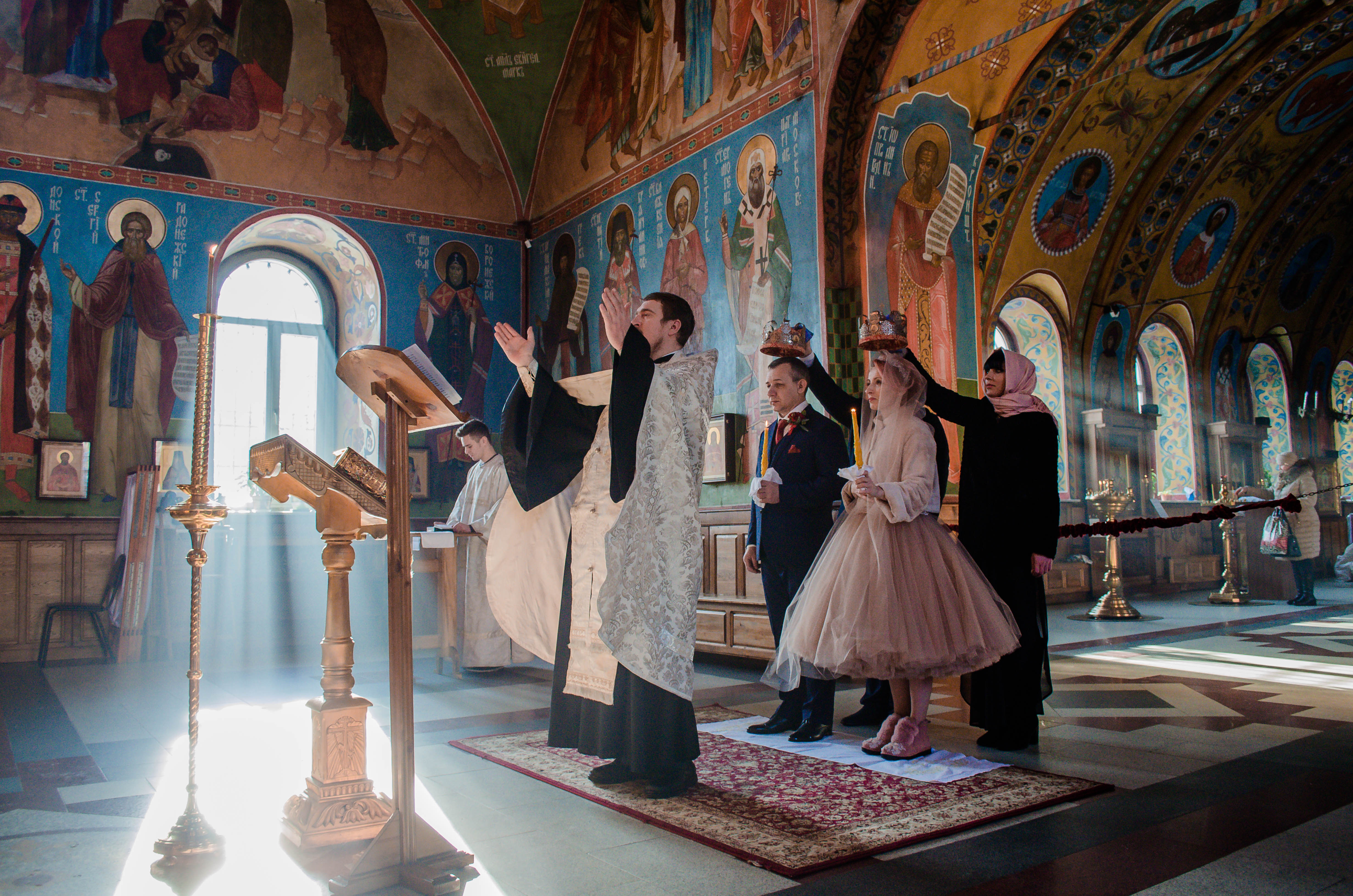
Attendants hold wedding crowns above the heads of a couple as the priest prays.

In the Eastern Orthodox Church, Holy Matrimony is considered a Sacred Mystery and the sign of the marriage is not the exchange of rings (done at the Betrothal) but rather the placing of crowns on the heads of the bride and groom. For this reason, this ceremony of the wedding is referred to as the Mystery of Crowning.

The priest leads the couple into the center of the church, where they stand on a piece of new, rose-colored fabric, symbolizing their entry into a new life. The bride and groom each publicly profess that they are marrying of their own free will and that they have not promised themselves to another.

After a litany and several longer prayers, the priest places crowns on the heads of the bride and the groom. These are then usually held over their heads by members of the wedding party. Following that are readings from the Epistle and Gospel, litanys, brief prayers, and the sharing of a "common cup" of wine (or grape juice) by the bride and groom.

A procession then takes place during which the priest wraps his epitrachelion (stole) around the joined hands of the bride and groom and leads them, and the attendants holding the crowns, three times around an analogion on which the Gospel Book has been placed. This short procession symbolizes the pilgrimage of wedded life.

An old custom was that the bride and groom would wear their wedding crowns for eight days, but in modern times, crowns are often removed after the service. The priest traditionally gives more blessings for the bride and groom, and then the dismisses the wedding party and congregation.

=== Civil ceremony ===
Following the traditional ceremony, the couple must have a civil ceremony called rospis' v zagse. This ceremony takes place at the Department of Public Services, formally known as ZAGS. At the office, the couple is greeted by family members with bread and salt. The ceremony ranges from 15 to 30 minutes and during this time, rings are exchanged and the couple is pronounced husband and wife.

In some regions, the parents offer the married couple two crystal glasses, which they are asked to break. The ideology is that the number of shards will be the number of years the marriage will last.

It is also customary for the married couple to release either balloons or, more preferred, two white doves to symbolize their love and partnership. The bride also releases another balloon with her maiden name written on it, symbolic of its farewell.

=== Tour of the city ===
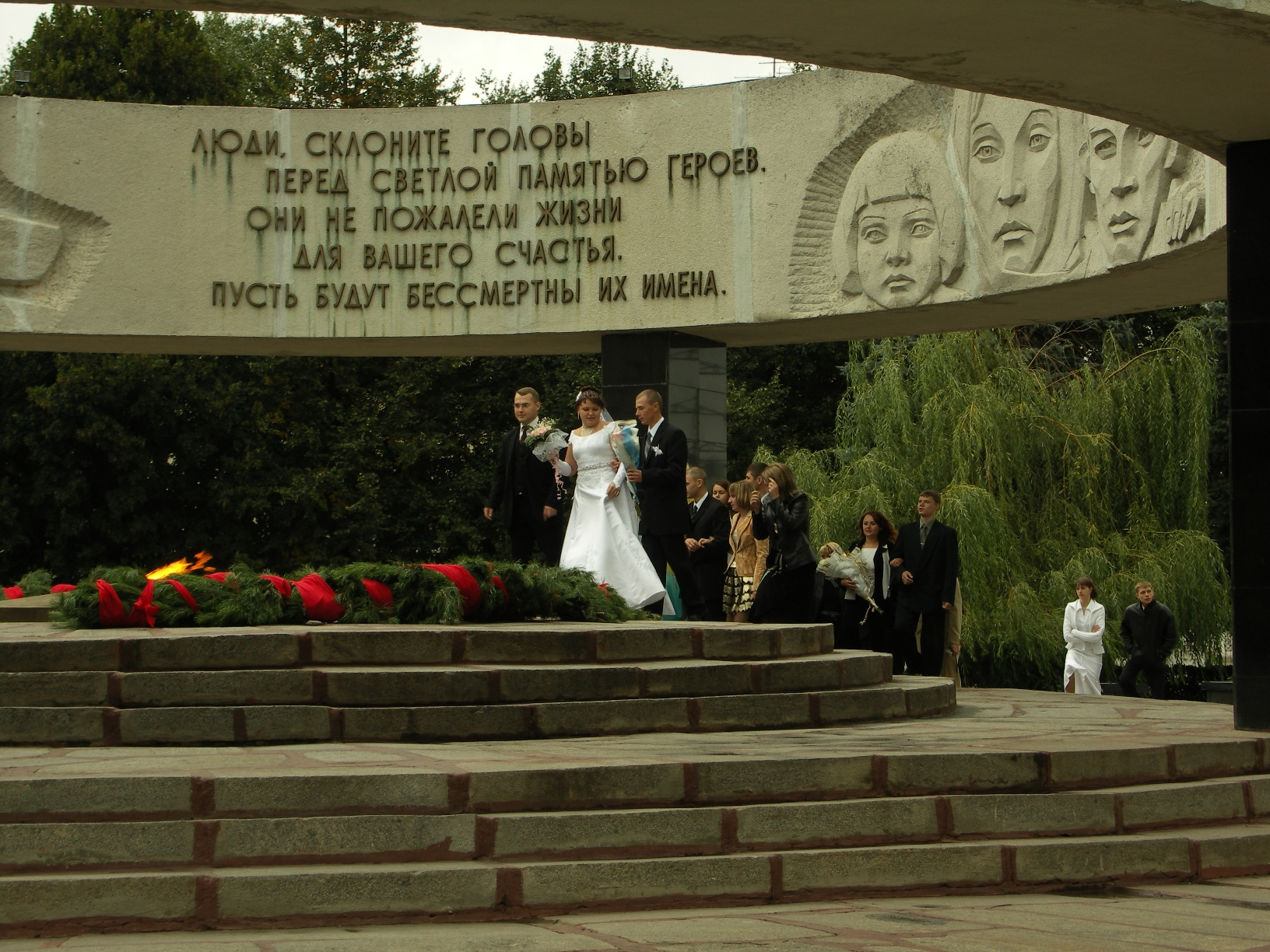
Wedding couple at a war memorial

Following the civil ceremony, the newlyweds and their witnesses often travel around the city in a limousine and tour many historical sites. There are times when close friends join them as well. This presents the primary opportunity for the majority of the wedding photographs that are taken at varying historical places around the town or city.

The wedding car is usually decorated with a doll. It is believed to catch all the enthusiasm and the good wishes of people around. Afterward, this doll is washed and kept by the couple for luck.

=== Reception ===
After touring the city for several hours, the couple meets the guests for the reception. The first toast is made to the newlyweds, and after the first shot the guests begin to shout Goŕko ("bitter"). At this point, the couple must kiss for a long time to counteract the bitter taste of the wine (or grape juice). The second toast is made to the parents. Afterward, the new couple steps onto the floor for the first dance of the night. The guests dance, sing, play games, and make toasts as the night goes on. For the next several days, the family continues to eat, drink, and celebrate. It is traditional to have an entertainer (tamada) who organizes the games, dancing, and ensures the guests get to know each other and are looked after.
