= Marriage in Greece =

Marriage in Greece is allowed for both residents and non-residents of the country. Marriages may be civil or religious; civil marriages are performed by the mayor. In most cases religious ceremonies will be conducted by the Greek Orthodox church. Same-sex marriage has been legal in Greece since 2024.

Greece legally recognizes two forms of marriage: civil and religious. Civil marriages are conducted by a mayor or civil official, while religious marriages are usually performed by a priest of the Greek Orthodox Church. Both are legally binding, and couples may choose either or both. To marry in Greece, both parties must typically provide a certificate of no impediment, an apostilled birth certificate, and official translations of key documents into Greek.

Traditional Greek Orthodox weddings also include symbolic rituals such as the crowning of the couple (stefana), the ceremonial walk around the altar, and the use of koufeta (sugar-coated almonds), which reflect spiritual unity and family blessings.

== Gallery ==
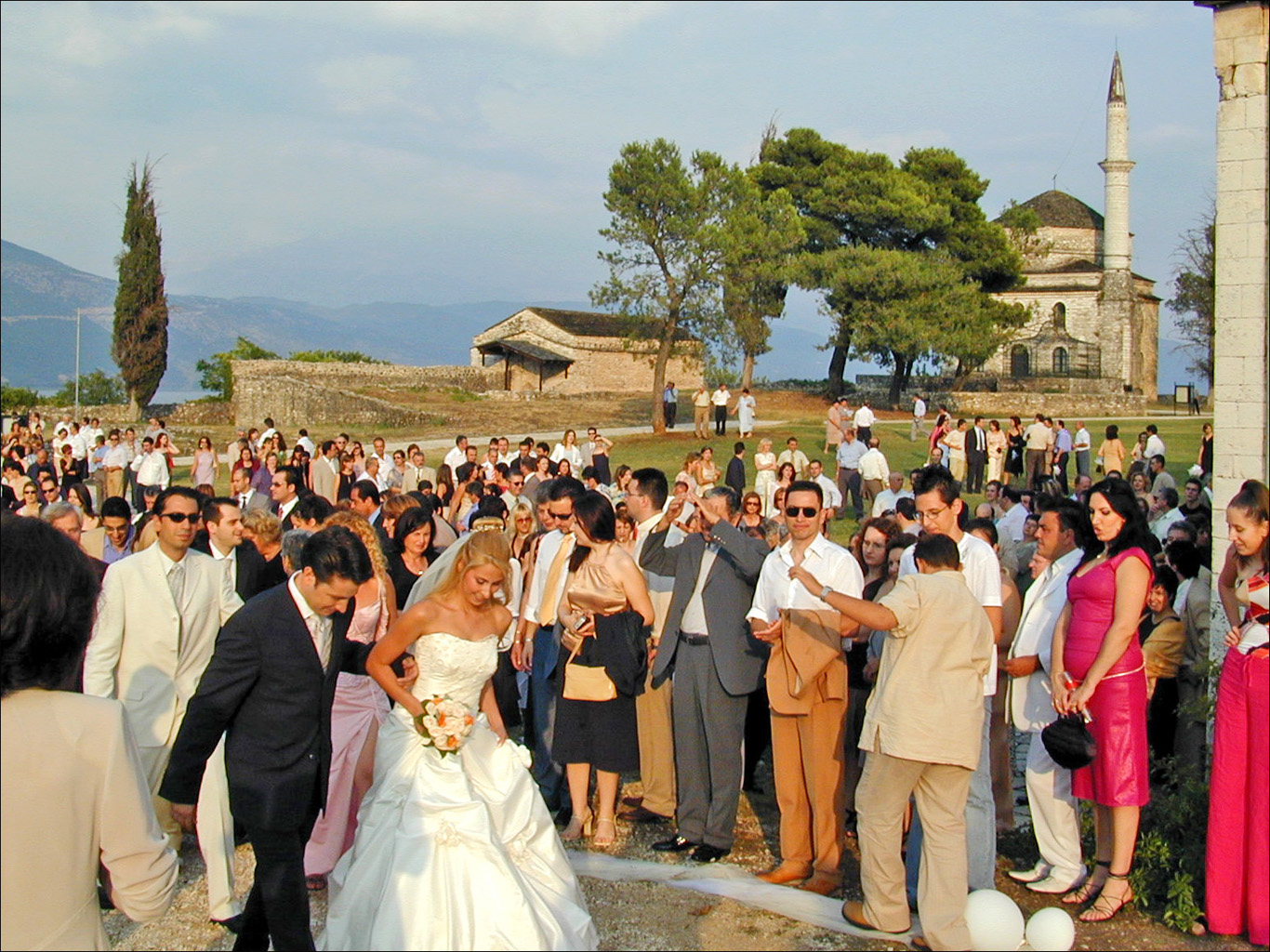
A wedding in Ioannina, 2012

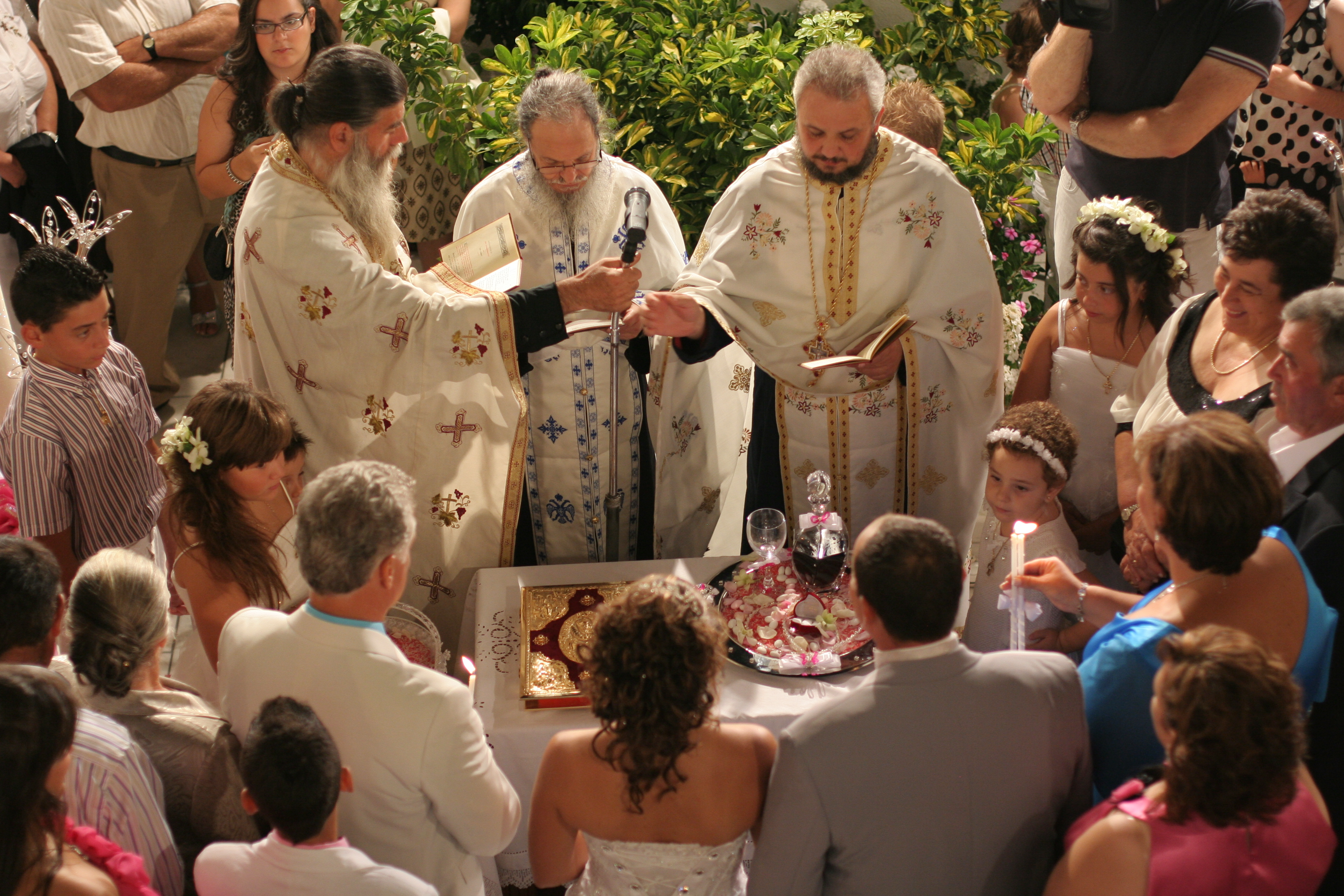
A Greek Orthodox wedding
