= Marriage in the Republic of Ireland =

Legal process in Ireland

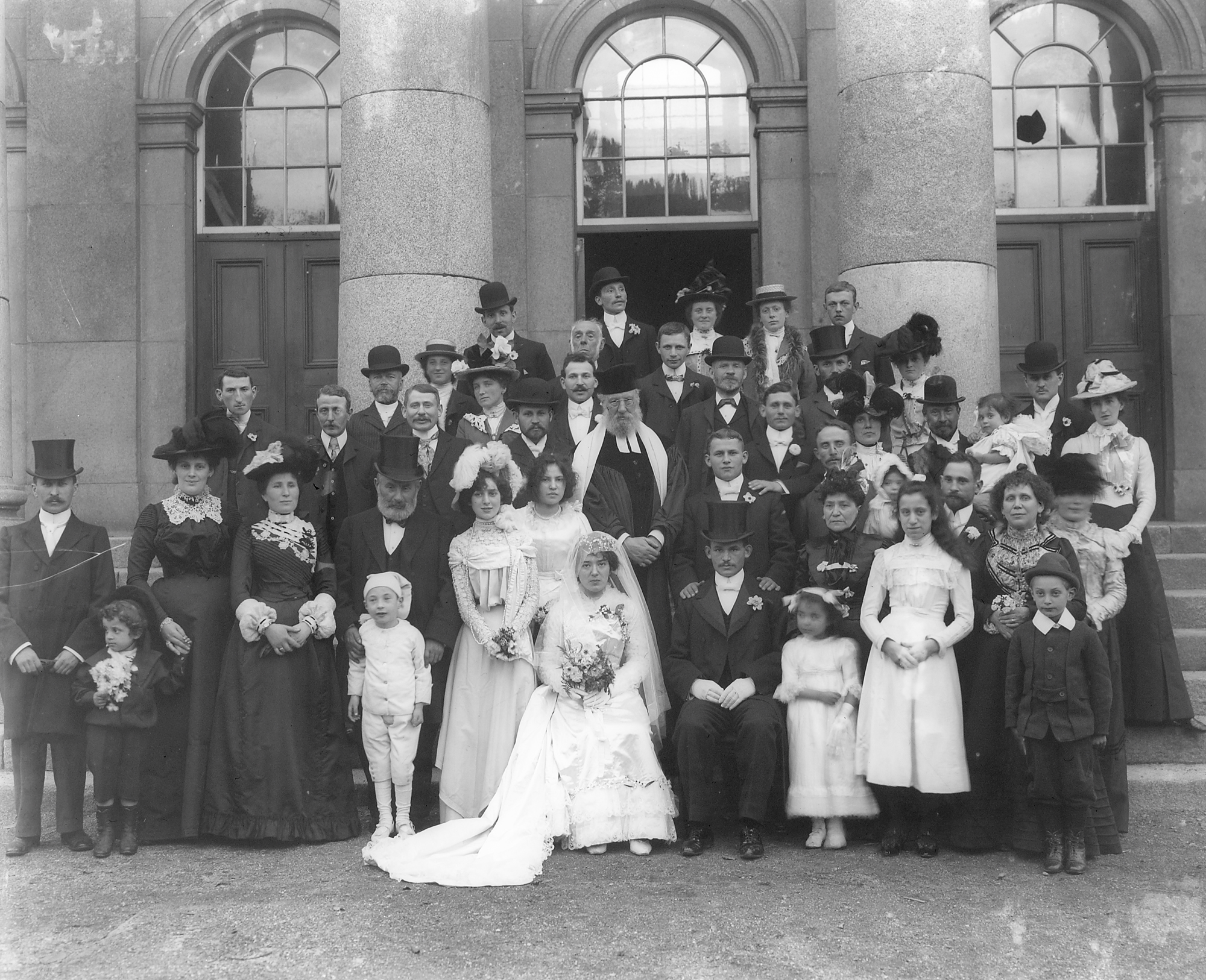
Jewish wedding at Waterford Courthouse, 1901

Marriage in the Republic of Ireland is a long-standing institution, regulated by various civil and religious codes over time. Today, marriages are registered by the civil registration service, and solemnised by a solemniser chosen from a list maintained by Department of Social Protection. The list includes priests, imams, rabbis, humanist celebrants, civil registrars themselves, and others. The minimum age to marry in Ireland is 18.

== Registration ==
Three months advance notice of intent to marry, provided to the local branch of the civil registration service, is required, starting from when the relevant application is received by the service.

A marriage registration form must be prepared, and issued by the relevant civil registrar; sometimes known as a marriage licence, no legal marriage can now occur without this.

Prior to the issue of the form, couples at least one of whom is a foreign national, or involving an EU national and a non-EU national, must attend an interview, and in certain circumstances, the civil registrar can refuse to issue the marriage licence. Such decisions can be appealed to the courts. The marriage registration form is finalised after the solemnisation of the marriage, and becomes valid when signed by the two parties to the wedding, and the solemniser.

== Statistics ==
As of 2017, 52.8% of opposite sex marriages were solemnised in Catholic Church services, while 1,727 couples, for example, solemnised with Humanist Association of Ireland services and 1,159 couples with Spiritual Union of Ireland services.

As of 2015, about 1/3 of marriages were solemnised by civil registrars; a limitation on this service was that it could only perform the ceremony from Monday to Friday, though venues beyond civil registry offices were permitted, with certain exclusions, such as beaches and private back gardens.

Arranged marriages, both legal and illegal, were common before the end of the twentieth century, but later became more common among immigrant communities.

== Activism and reform ==
Prior to 1995, divorce was constitutionally prohibited; both church and civil annulments (declarations that a marriage never existed legally, for example for reasons of incapacity) were possible but rare. Although the Catholic Church campaigned against divorce, the Fifteenth Amendment of the Constitution of Ireland passed in 1995, and divorce was legalised.

Same-sex marriage in Ireland has been legal since 16 November 2015, following the 2015 Irish constitutional referendum. Its introduction was preceded by the use of civil partnerships in 2010, which gave same-sex couples rights and responsibilities similar, but not equal to, those of civil marriage.

== Legal Requirements for Marriage in Ireland ==
Under Irish law, all couples intending to marry in Ireland must provide a minimum of three months' notice to a civil registrar, regardless of nationality or place of residence.

Couples residing outside Ireland may submit their notification of intention to marry by post. To do so, they must contact a Health Service Executive (HSE) Civil Registration Service office to request the relevant forms, which must be returned to the registrar no fewer than three months before the intended marriage date. A non-refundable fee of €200 is required at the time of notification.

Irish law additionally requires both parties to appear in person before a registrar no fewer than five days before the ceremony. At this appointment, the registrar verifies original identity documents and confirms there are no legal impediments to the marriage. Upon completion, the registrar issues a Marriage Registration Form (MRF), which must be presented to the officiant before the ceremony can legally take place.
