= Rišpet =

Croatian non-profit LGBT rights organization

Rišpet - LGBT Association Split
- Rišpet - LGBT udruga Split
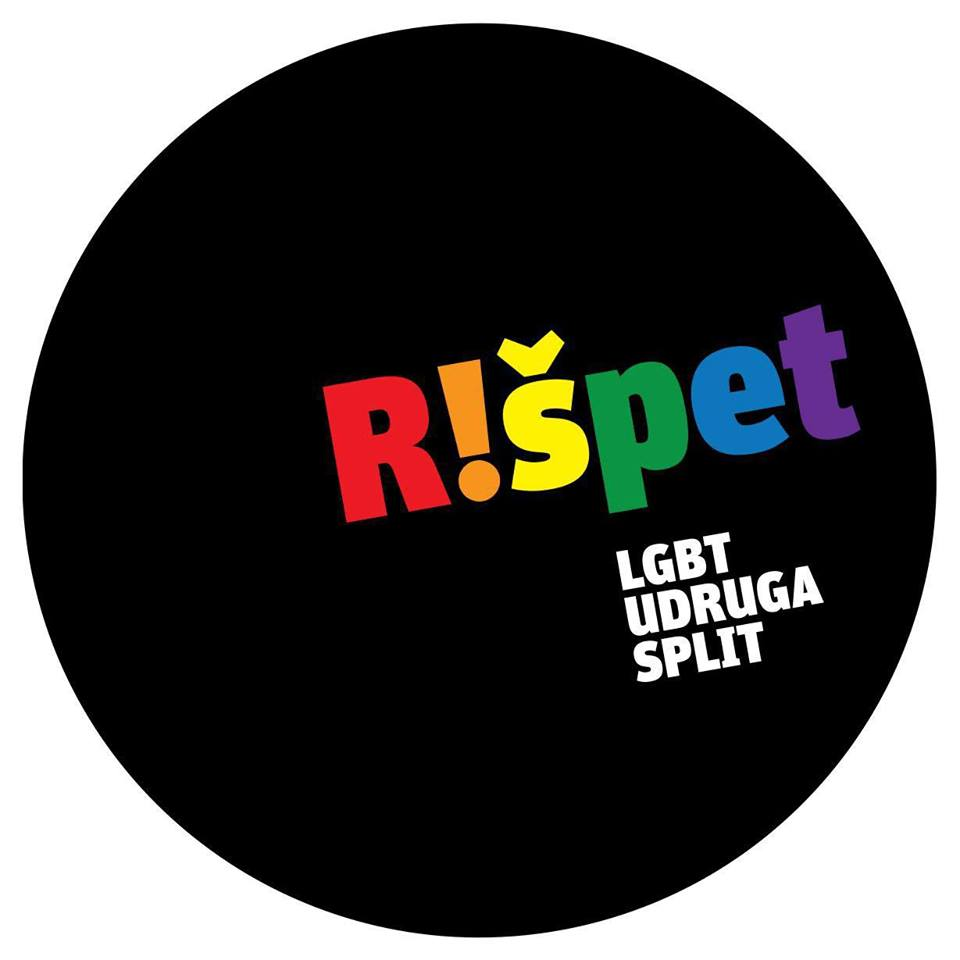
- Formation: 4 March 2013
- Founder: Former volunteers of Split Pride
- Founded at: Split
- Dissolved: 3 February 2020
- Type: Non-governmental organization
- Headquarters: Ulica kralja Tomislava 8, Split
- Location: Split Croatia
- Region served: Dalmatia
- Fields: LGBT rights
- Website: www.facebook.com/RispetLGBT

Rišpet - LGBT Association Split was a non-governmental organization that advocated for LGBT rights in Croatia, mainly focused on the LGBT citizens of Split. The organization was fairly active from 2013 and shrinking portfolio of activities later and stopped being active in 2018 and was dissolved in 2020.

== History ==
The NGO was established on March 4, 2013, by 2012 Split Pride volunteers.

The word Rišpet was used as local equivalent for Respect.

Rišpet founded LGBT Center Split, small and improvised physical space organized to operate as social center for LGBT community, their families, friends and all those who want to take part in the activities of the Centre. Rišpet also co-organized Split Pride.

The purpose of Rišpet was to deal with problems of violence towards LGBT persons, to empower and educate the community, thereby making it more sensible to LGBT problematics. Rišpet also organized various formal and informal activities for the local LGBT community, including film screenings, thematic workshops, exhibitions, public forums, Pride marches, festivals and conferences in Croatia and the region. Many activities were executed thanks to the volunteers and collaboration with other NGOs, without any financial resources.

Rišpet informed volunteers about the position of LGBT people in Croatia, as well as on methods and possibilities of their participation in the struggle for realization of the rights for a decent life, free of violence and discrimination. It encouraged them to think critically questioning the patriarchy, heteronormativity and the generally process of re-traditionalization and models that inhibit the development of democratic processes based on the principles of equality, justice and freedom. The goal of Rišpet was for the young volunteers to take part as the leaders in various activities of the LGBT center.

== Status ==
As of 2018 Rišpet is no longer active. Organization of the Split Pride and managing of LGBT Center Split was picked up by group of organizations from the city with the support of City of Split. The organization was officially removed from the register of NGOs in February, 2020.
