= List of diplomatic missions of Croatia =

This is a list of diplomatic missions of Croatia, excluding honorary consulates. Croatia is a European country located at the crossroads of Central Europe, Southeast Europe, and the Mediterranean.

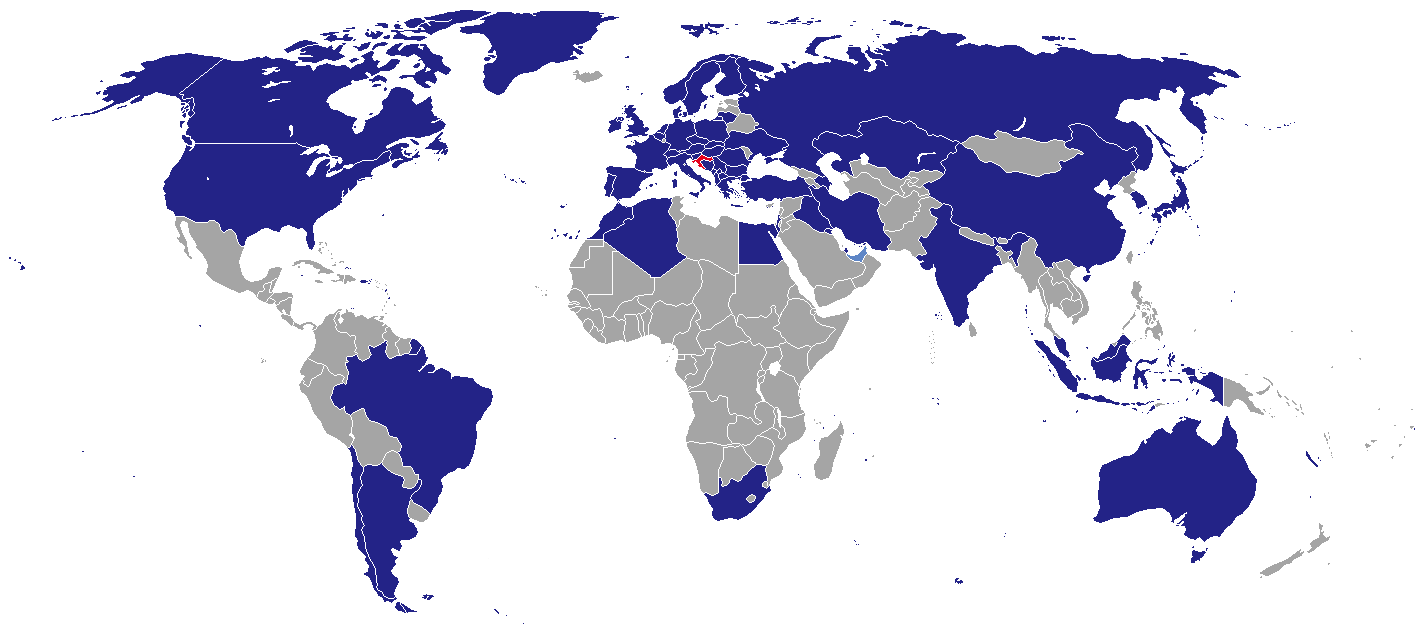
States hosting diplomatic missions of Croatia Croatia Embassy

== Current missions ==
=== Africa ===
Host country	Host city	Mission	Concurrent accreditation	Ref.
Algeria	Algiers	Embassy	Countries: Mali	
Egypt	Cairo	Embassy	Countries: Eritrea; Djibouti; Ethiopia; Jordan; Lebanon; Libya; Palestine; Saudi Arabia; Somalia; South Sudan; Sudan; Syria; United Arab Emirates; Yemen	
Morocco	Rabat	Embassy	Countries: Burkina Faso; Cameroon; Gabon; Ivory Coast; Mauritania; Senegal; Tunisia	
South Africa	Pretoria	Embassy	Countries: Botswana; Burundi; Comoros; Eswatini; Kenya; Madagascar; Malawi; Mauritius; Mozambique; Namibia; Rwanda; Seychelles; Tanzania; Uganda; Zambia; Zimbabwe	

=== Americas ===
Host country	Host city	Mission	Concurrent accreditation	Ref.
Argentina	Buenos Aires	Embassy	Countries: Paraguay; Uruguay	
Brazil	Brasília	Embassy	Countries: Colombia; Trinidad and Tobago; Venezuela	
Canada	Ottawa	Embassy		
Canada	Mississauga	Consulate–General		
Chile	Santiago de Chile	Embassy	Countries: Bolivia; Ecuador; Peru	
United States	Washington, D.C.	Embassy	Countries: Marshall Islands; Mexico; Micronesia; Palau; Panama; International Organizations: Organization of American States (Note: Accredited as an observer mission.)	
United States	Chicago	Consulate–General	Countries: Marshall Islands; Mexico; Micronesia; Palau; Panama; International Organizations: Organization of American States	
United States	Los Angeles	Consulate–General	Countries: Marshall Islands; Mexico; Micronesia; Palau; Panama; International Organizations: Organization of American States	
United States	New York City	Consulate–General	Countries: Marshall Islands; Mexico; Micronesia; Palau; Panama; International Organizations: Organization of American States	

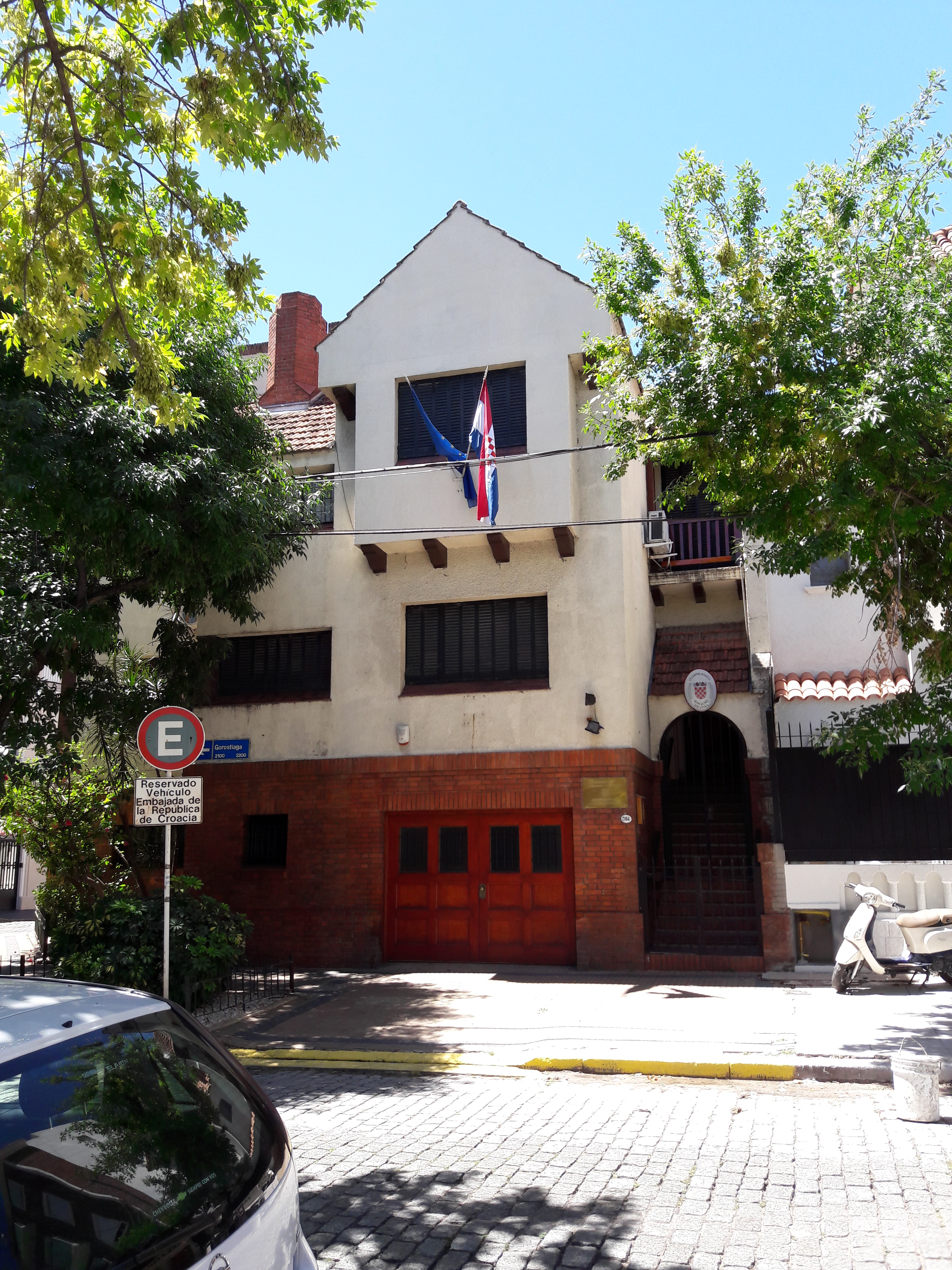
Embassy in Buenos Aires

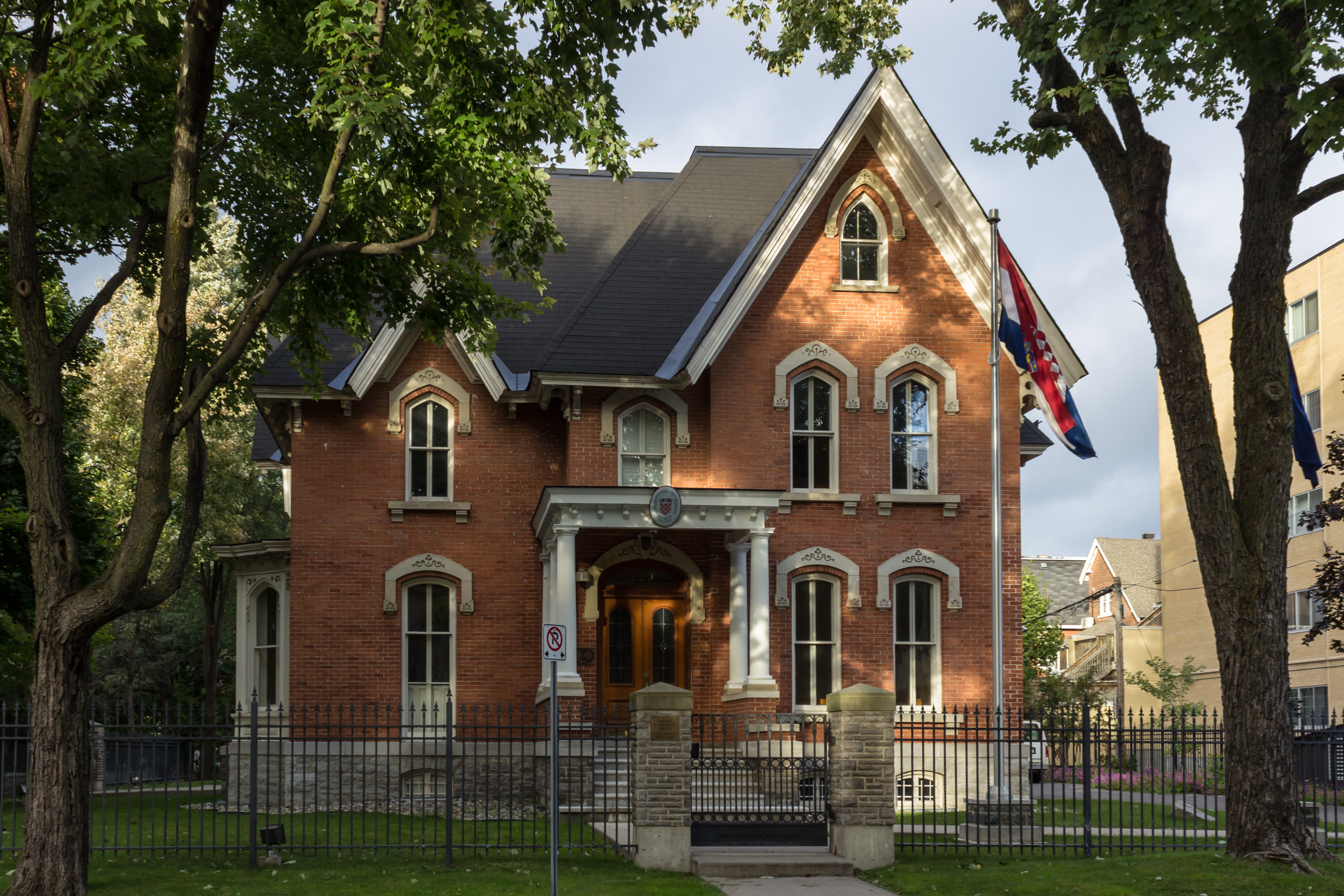
Embassy in Ottawa

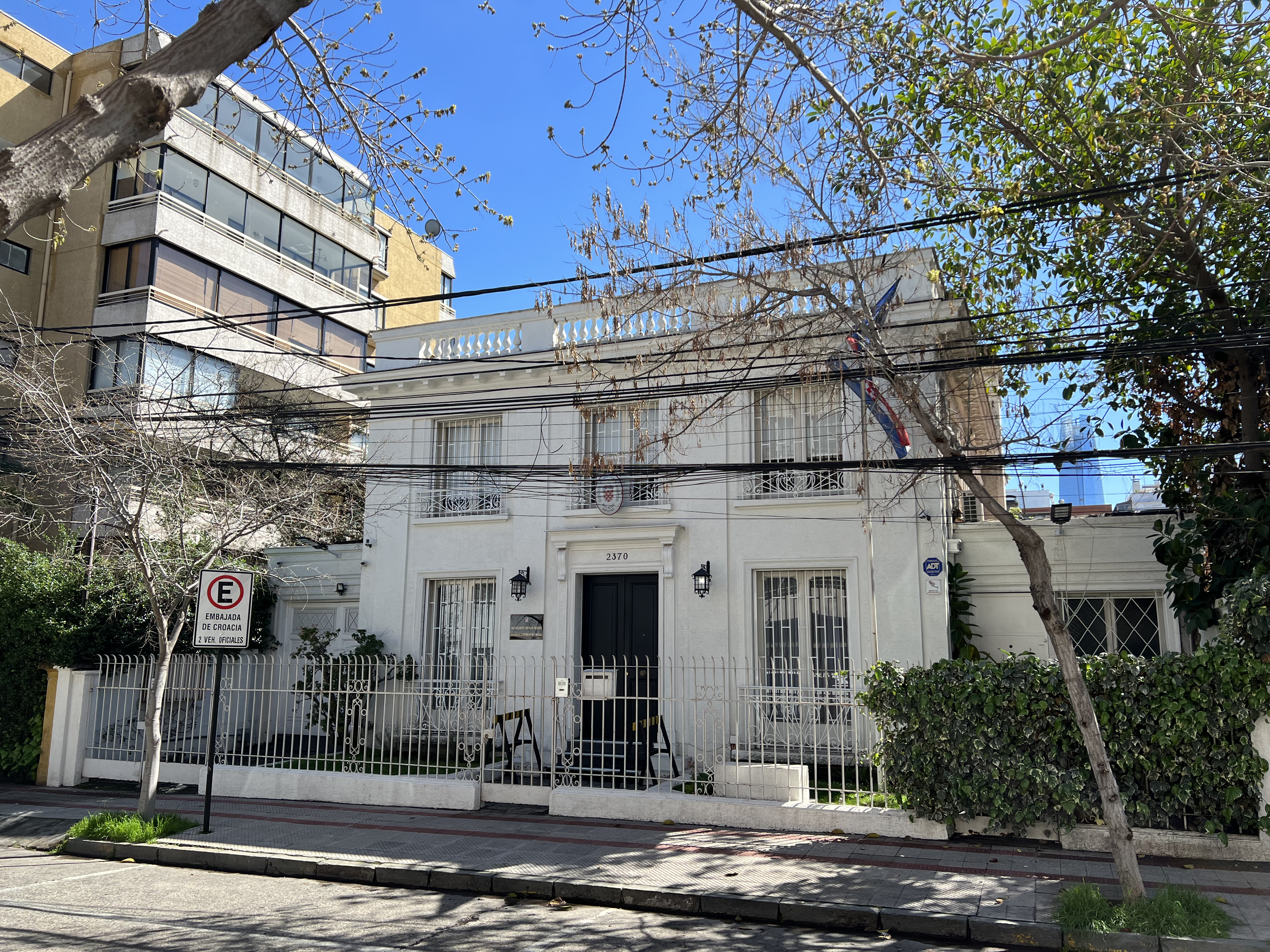
Embassy in Santiago de Chile

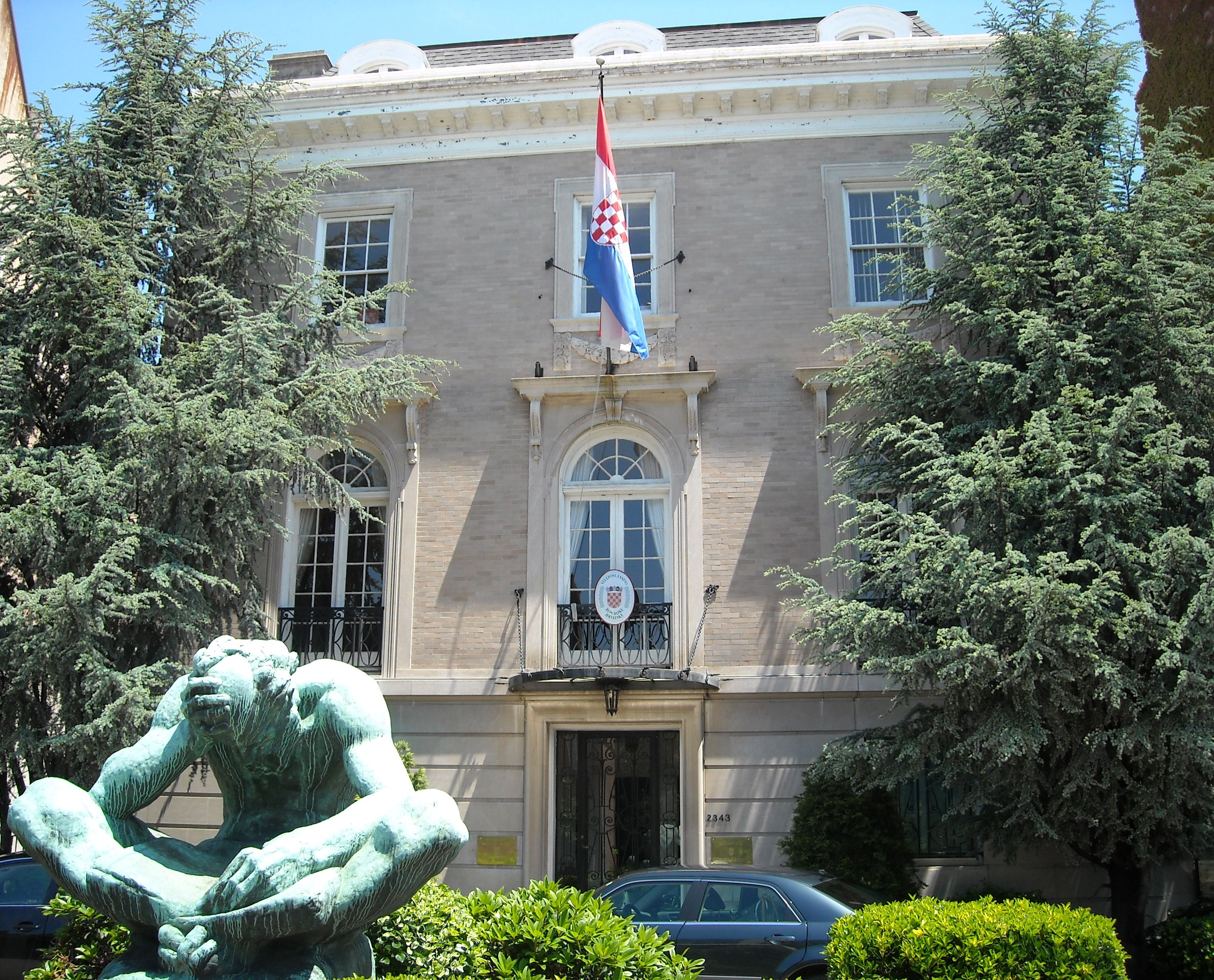
Embassy in Washington, D.C.

=== Asia ===
Host country	Host city	Mission	Concurrent accreditation	Ref.
Azerbaijan	Baku	Embassy	Countries: Georgia	
China	Beijing	Embassy	Countries: Mongolia; North Korea	
India	New Delhi	Embassy	Countries: Bangladesh; Maldives; Nepal; Sri Lanka; Consular jurisdiction only: Bhutan (Note: Bhutan is listed only under the consular jurisdiction of the Croatian Embassy in New Delhi. As of 2021, the two countries have yet to establish formal diplomatic relations.)	
Indonesia	Jakarta	Embassy	Countries: East Timor; Philippines; Singapore; Thailand; International Organizations: Association of Southeast Asian Nations	
Iran	Tehran	Embassy	Countries: Pakistan	
Iraq	Baghdad	Embassy		
Israel	Tel Aviv	Embassy		
Japan	Tokyo	Embassy		
Kazakhstan	Astana	Embassy	Countries: Kyrgyzstan; Tajikistan; Uzbekistan	
Kuwait	Kuwait City	Embassy	Countries: Bahrain	
Malaysia	Kuala Lumpur	Embassy	Countries: Brunei; Cambodia; Laos; Myanmar; Vietnam	
Qatar	Doha	Embassy	Countries: Oman	
South Korea	Seoul	Embassy		
Turkey	Ankara	Embassy	Countries: Afghanistan; Turkmenistan	
Turkey	Istanbul	Consulate–General	Countries: Afghanistan; Turkmenistan	
United Arab Emirates	Dubai	Consulate-General		

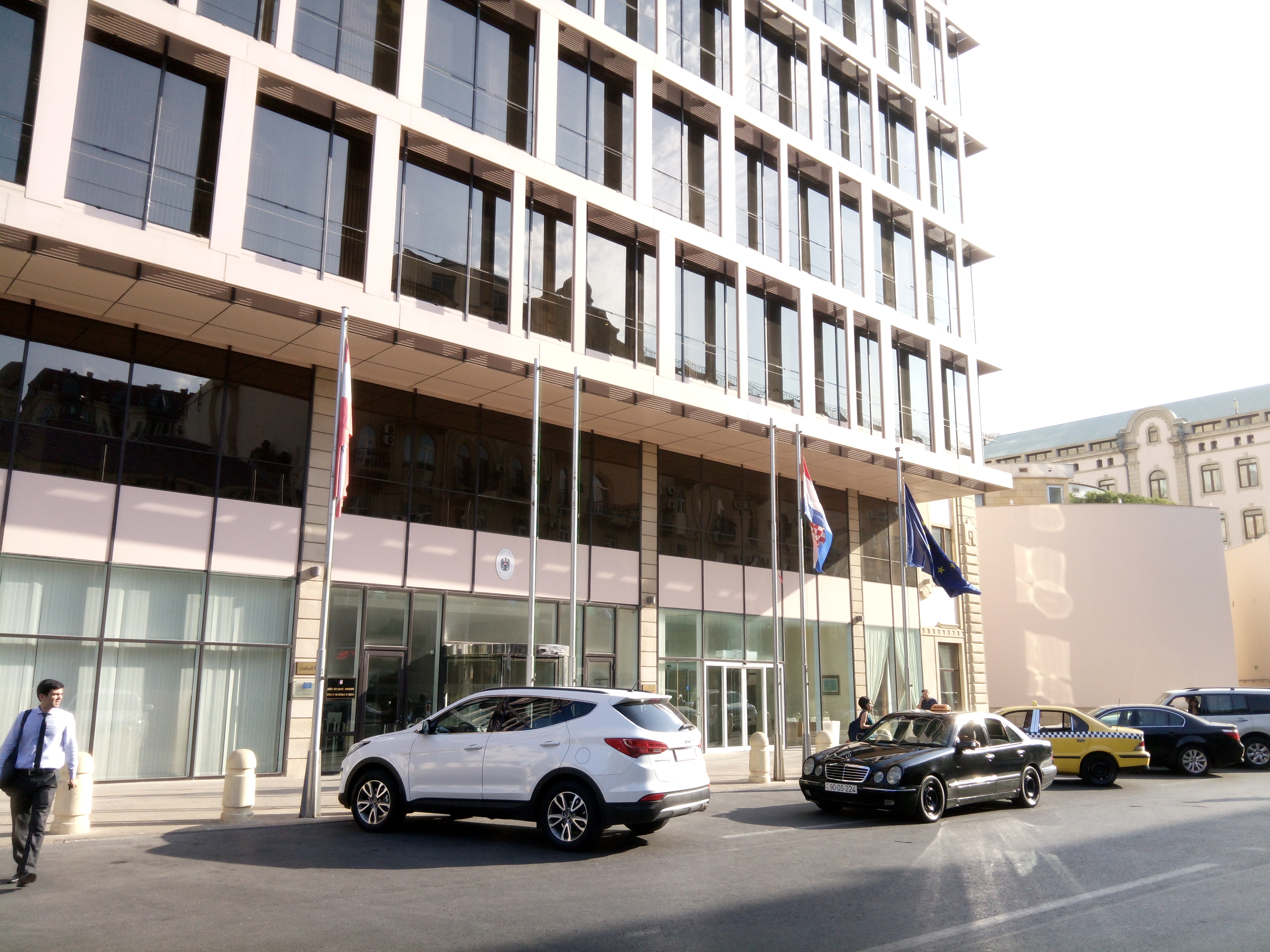
Embassy in Baku

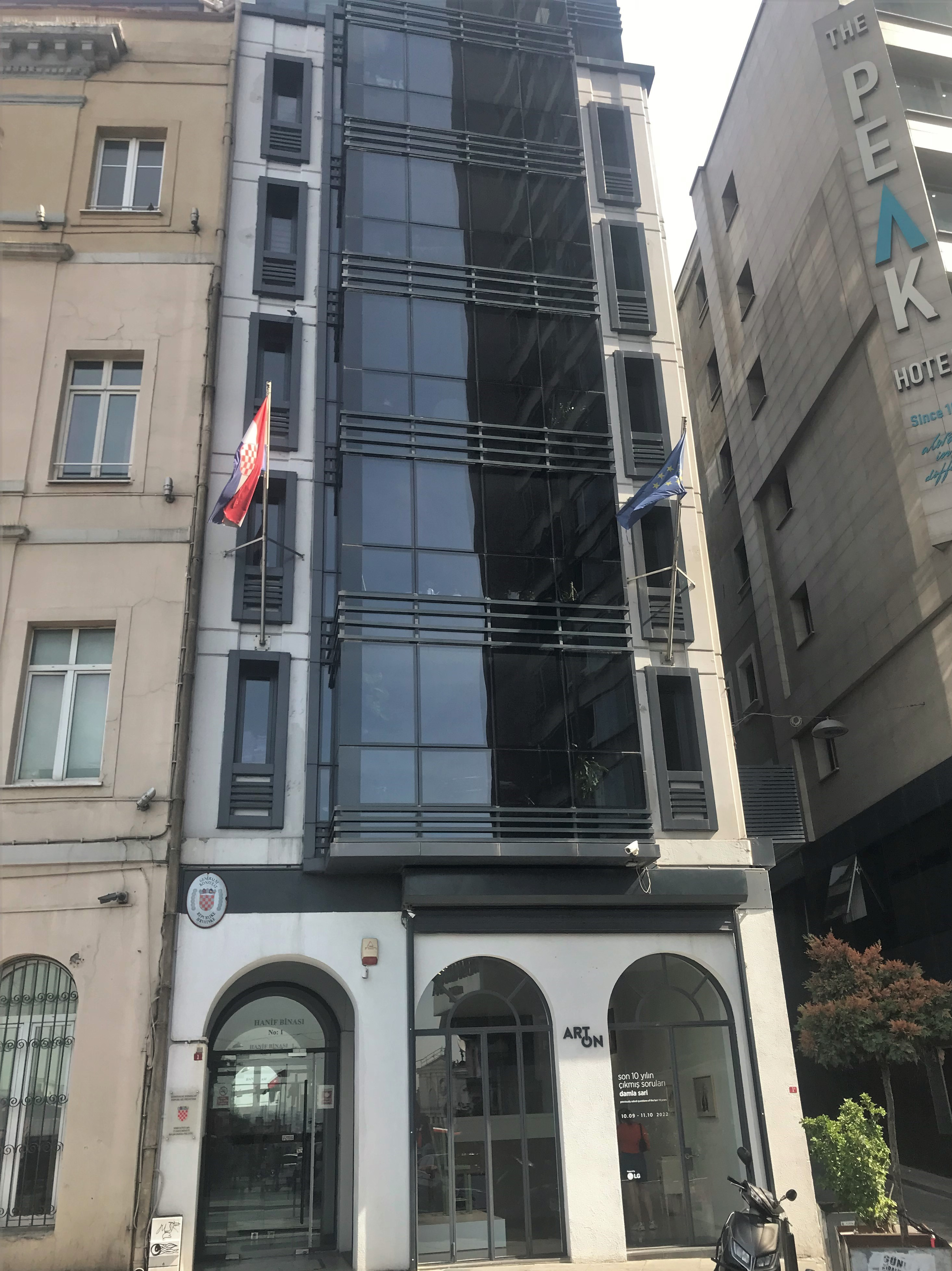
Consulate-General in Istanbul

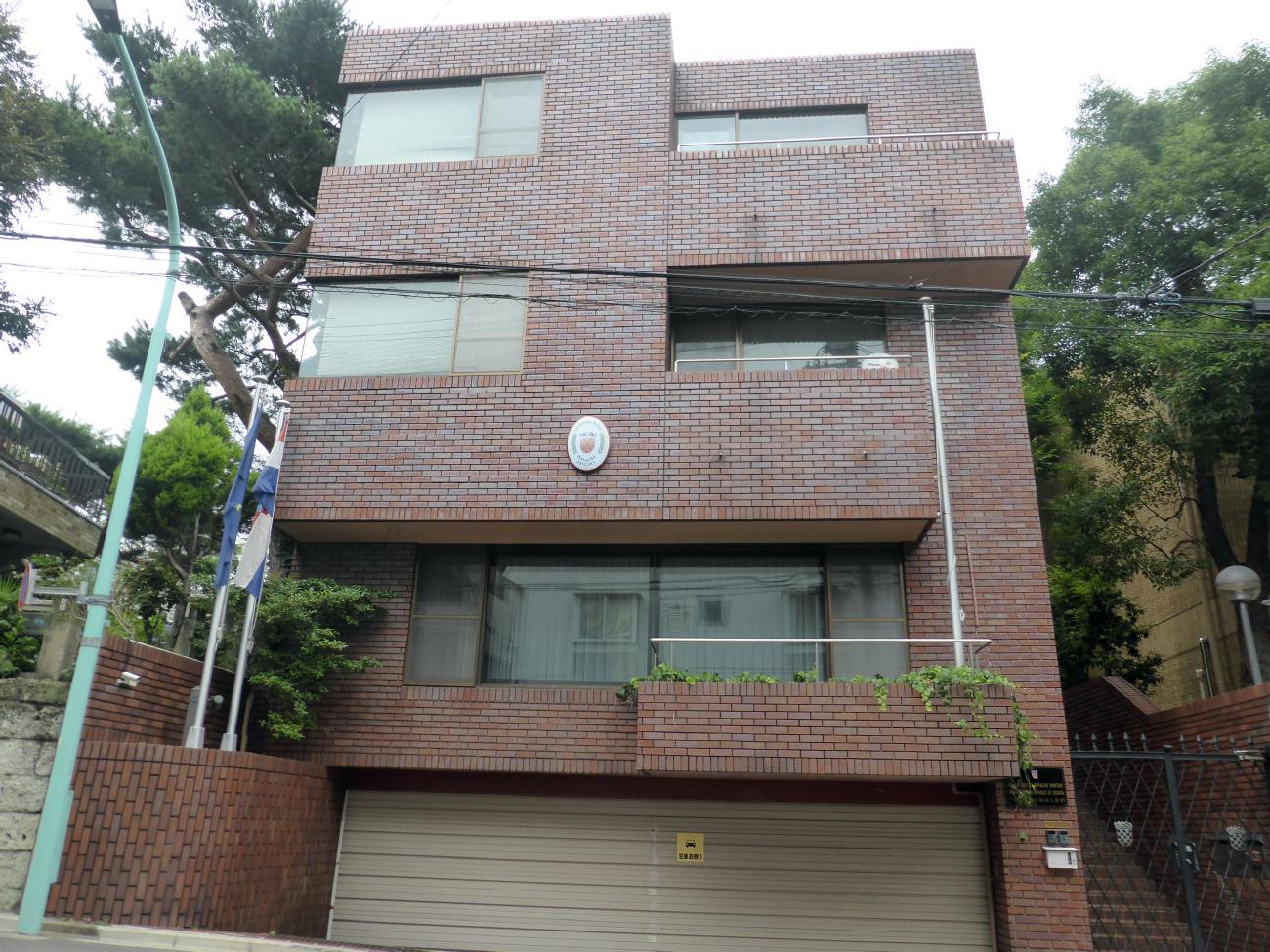
Embassy in Tokyo

=== Europe ===
Host country	Host city	Mission	Concurrent accreditation	Ref.
Albania	Tirana	Embassy		
Austria	Vienna	Embassy		
Belgium	Brussels	Embassy	Countries: Luxembourg	
Bosnia and Herzegovina	Sarajevo	Embassy		
Bosnia and Herzegovina	Banja Luka	Consulate–General		
Bosnia and Herzegovina	Mostar	Consulate–General		
Bosnia and Herzegovina	Tuzla	Consulate–General		
Bosnia and Herzegovina	Livno	Consulate		
Bosnia and Herzegovina	Orašje	Consulate		
Bosnia and Herzegovina	Vitez	Consulate		
Bulgaria	Sofia	Embassy		
Czech Republic	Prague	Embassy		
Denmark	Copenhagen	Embassy	Countries: Iceland	
Finland	Helsinki	Embassy	Countries: Estonia	
France	Paris	Embassy	Countries: Benin; Central African Republic; Congo-Brazzaville; Congo-Kinshasa; Chad; Equatorial Guinea; Guinea; Monaco; Niger; Togo	
Germany	Berlin	Embassy		
Germany	Düsseldorf	Consulate–General		
Germany	Frankfurt	Consulate–General		
Germany	Hamburg	Consulate–General		
Germany	Munich	Consulate–General		
Germany	Stuttgart	Consulate–General		
Greece	Athens	Embassy	Countries: Armenia; Cyprus	
Holy See (Note: The Croatian Embassy to the Holy See is located outside Vatican territory in Rome.)	Rome	Embassy	Sovereign entity: Sovereign Military Order of Malta	
Hungary	Budapest	Embassy		
Hungary	Pécs	Consulate–General		
Ireland	Dublin	Embassy		
Italy	Rome	Embassy	Countries: Malta; San Marino; International Organizations: Food and Agriculture Organization; International Fund for Agricultural Development; World Food Programme	
Italy	Milan	Consulate-General	Countries: Malta; San Marino; International Organizations: Food and Agriculture Organization; International Fund for Agricultural Development; World Food Programme	
Italy	Trieste	Consulate-General	Countries: Malta; San Marino; International Organizations: Food and Agriculture Organization; International Fund for Agricultural Development; World Food Programme	
Kosovo	Pristina	Embassy		
Lithuania	Vilnius	Embassy		
Montenegro	Podgorica	Embassy		
Montenegro	Kotor	Consulate–General		
Netherlands	The Hague	Embassy	International Organizations: OPCW	
North Macedonia	Skopje	Embassy		
Norway	Oslo	Embassy		
Poland	Warsaw	Embassy		
Portugal	Lisbon	Embassy	Countries: Angola; Cape Verde; Guinea-Bissau; São Tomé and Príncipe	
Romania	Bucharest	Embassy	Countries: Moldova	
Russia	Moscow	Embassy	Countries: Belarus	
Serbia	Belgrade	Embassy		
Serbia	Subotica	Consulate–General		
Slovakia	Bratislava	Embassy		
Slovenia	Ljubljana	Embassy		
Spain	Madrid	Embassy	Countries: Andorra; Cuba	
Sweden	Stockholm	Embassy	Countries: Latvia	
Switzerland	Bern	Embassy	Countries: Liechtenstein	
Switzerland	Zürich	Consulate–General	Countries: Liechtenstein	
Ukraine	Kyiv	Embassy		
United Kingdom	London	Embassy	Countries: Gambia; Ghana; Liberia; Nigeria; Sierra Leone	

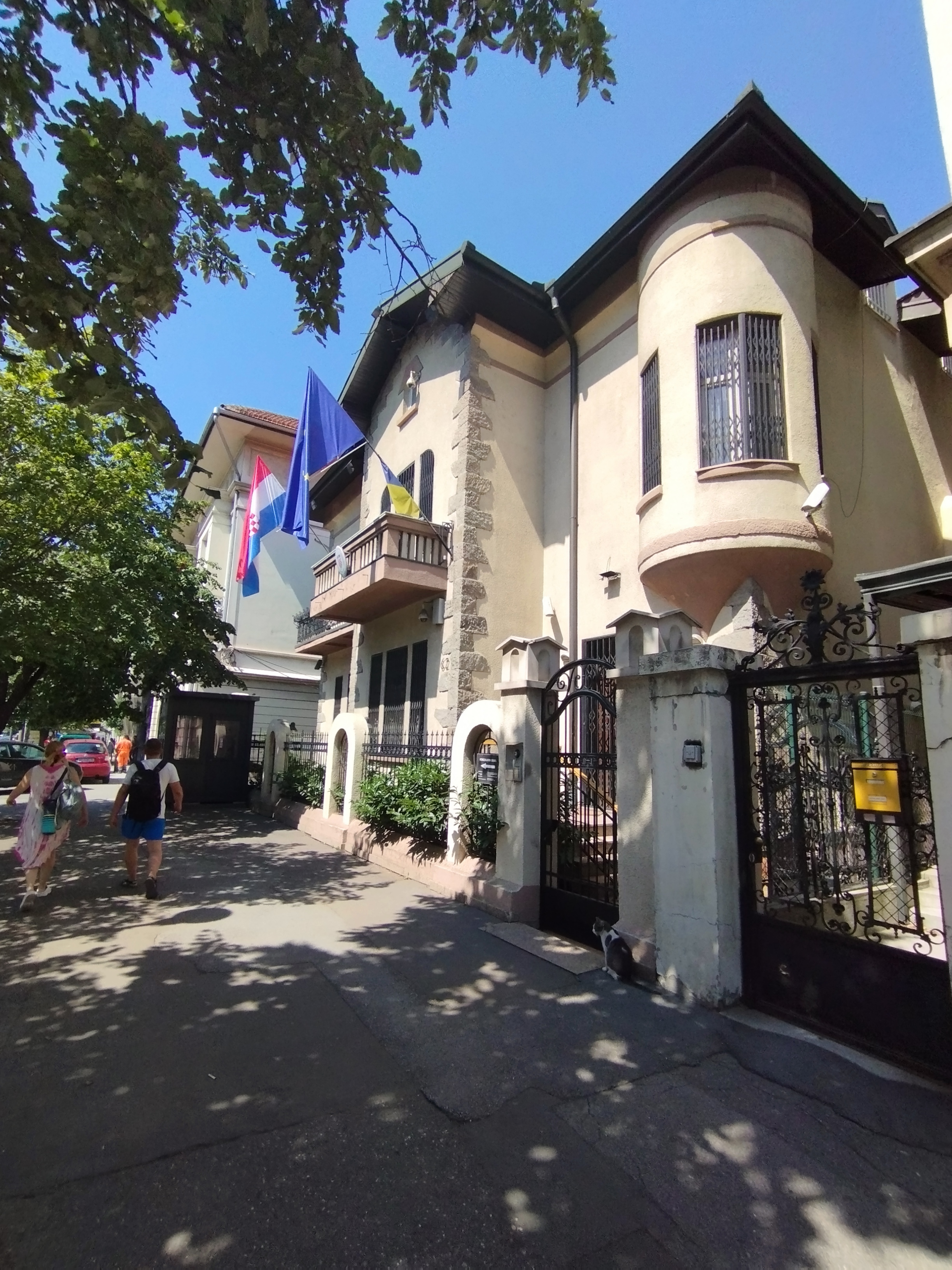
Embassy in Belgrade

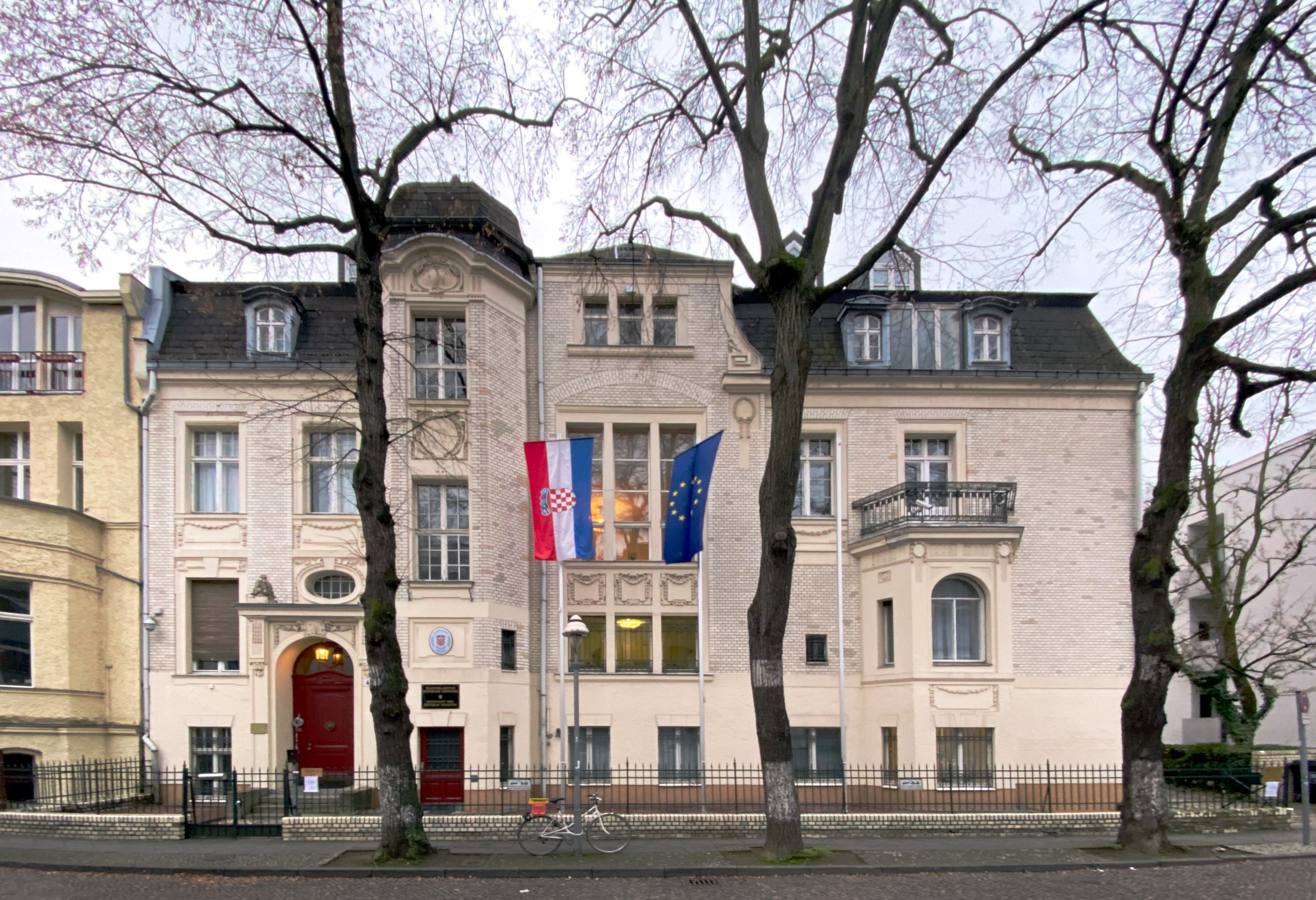
Embassy in Berlin

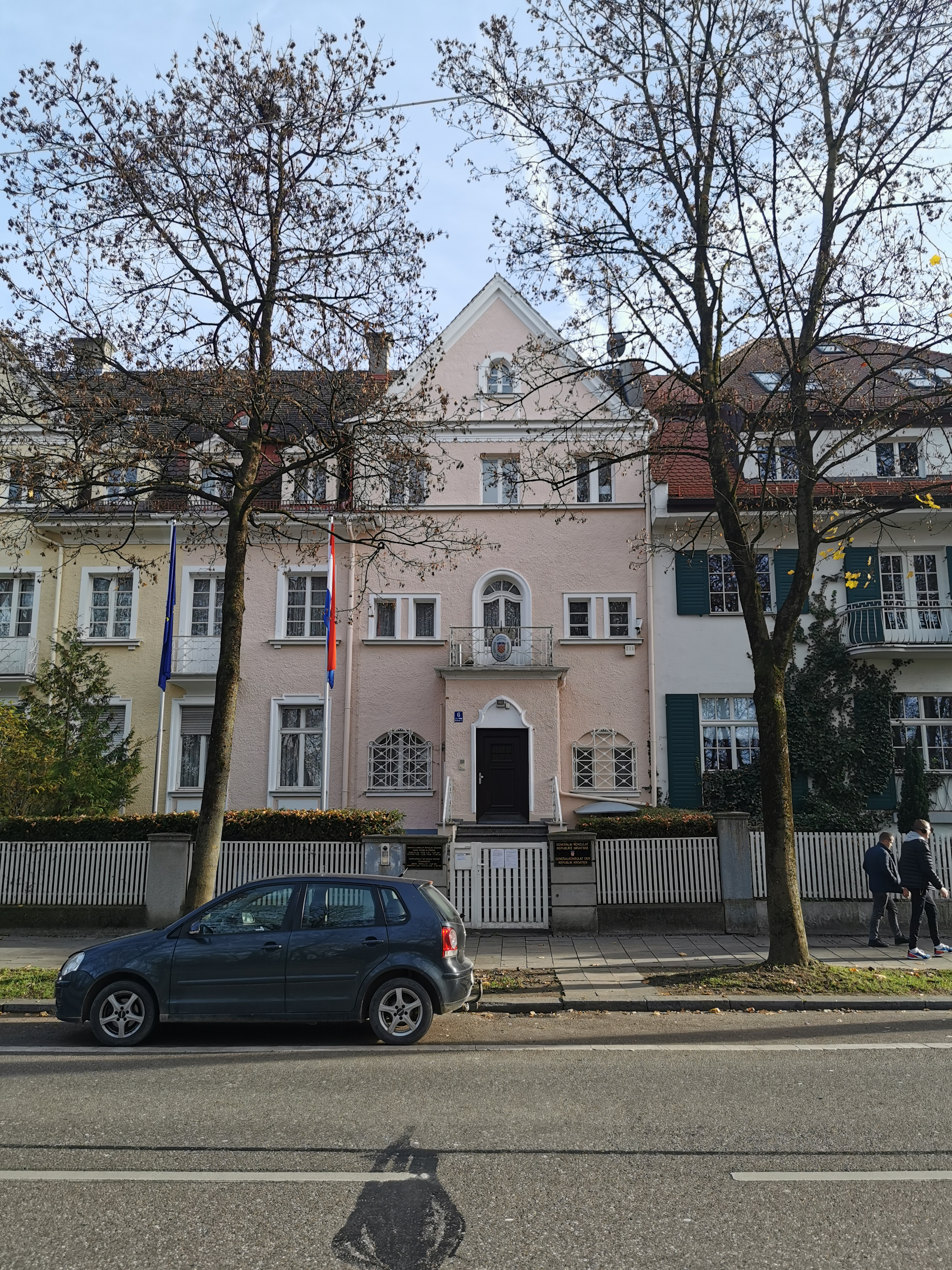
Consulate-General in Munich

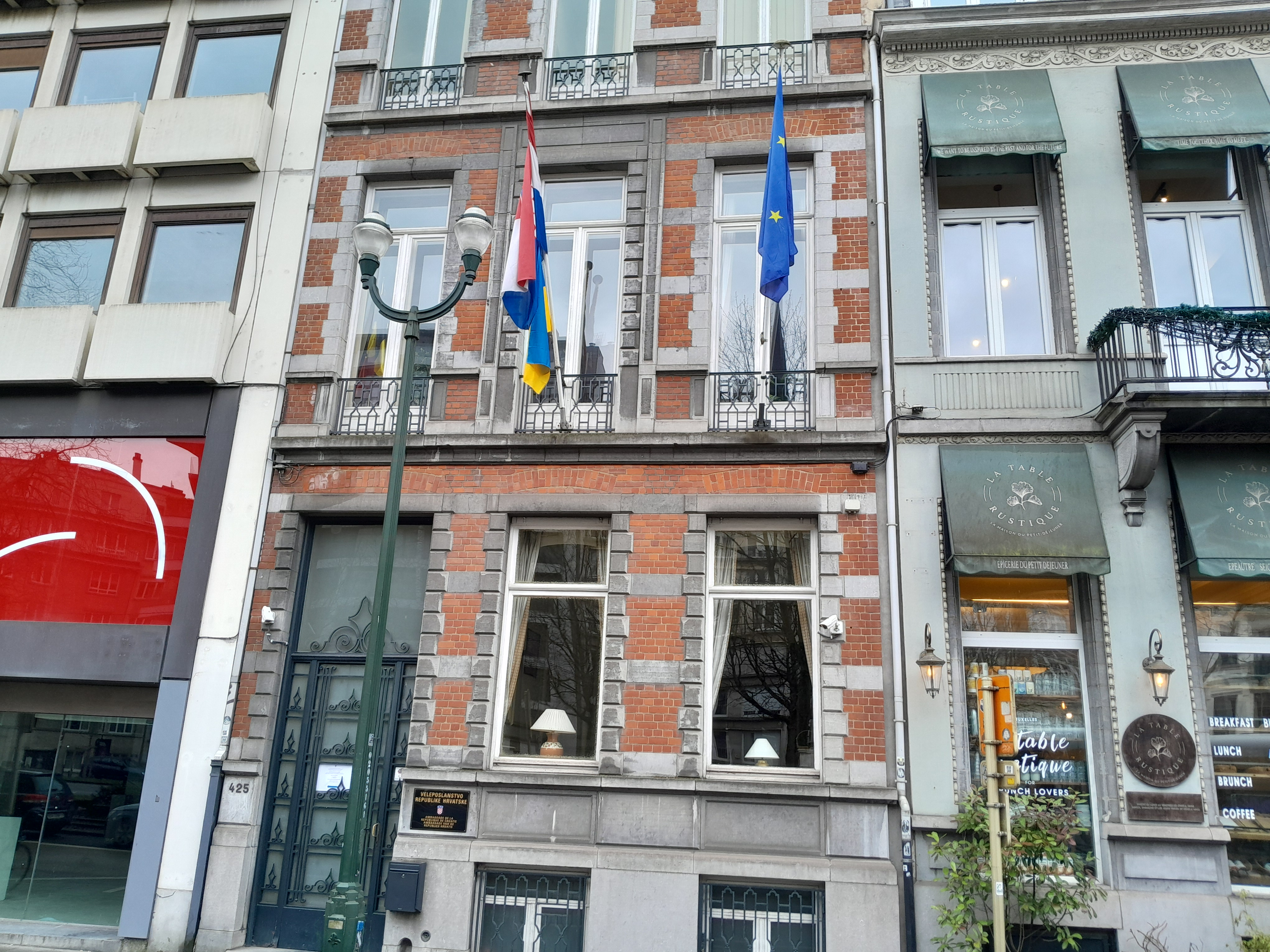
Embassy in Brussels

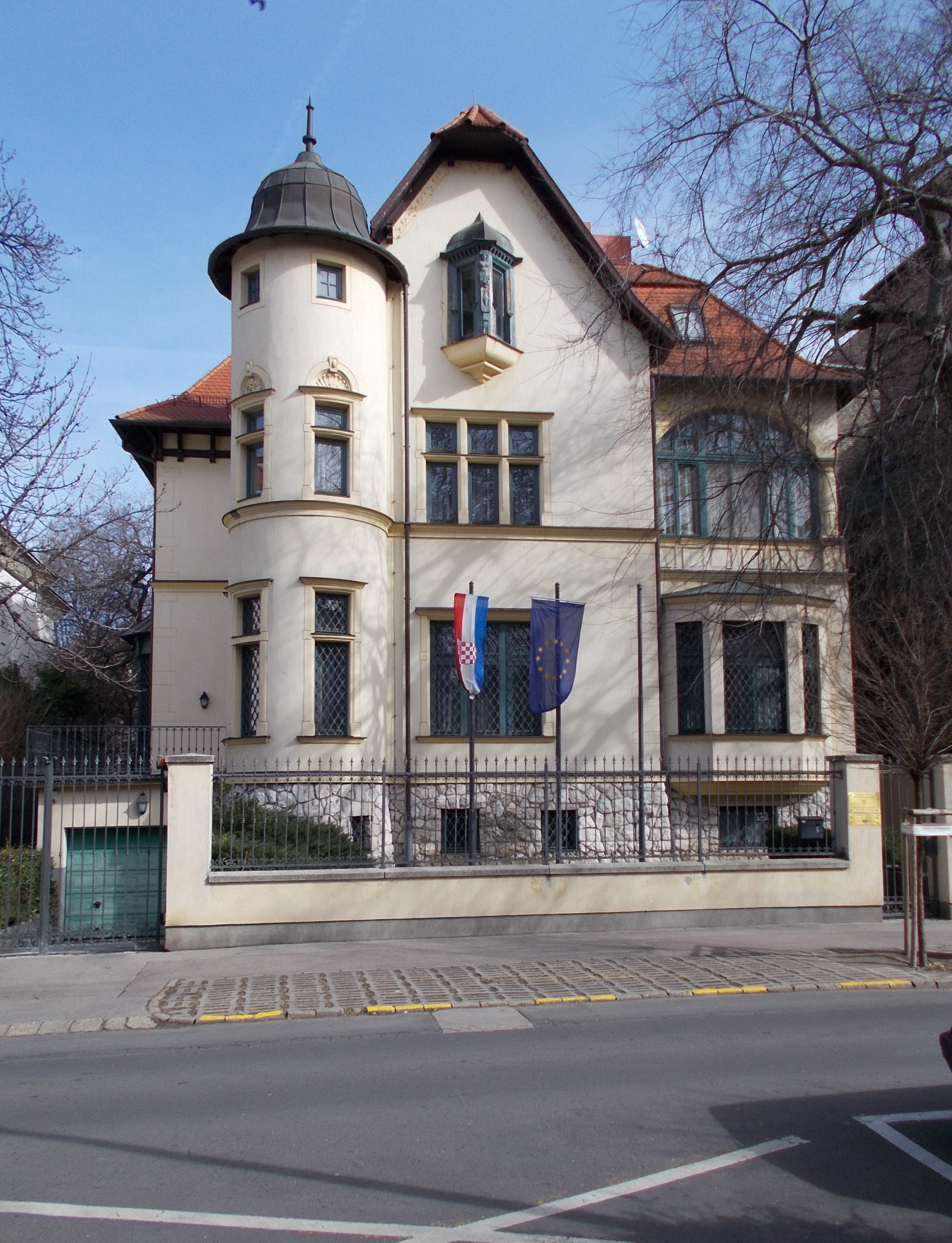
Embassy in Budapest

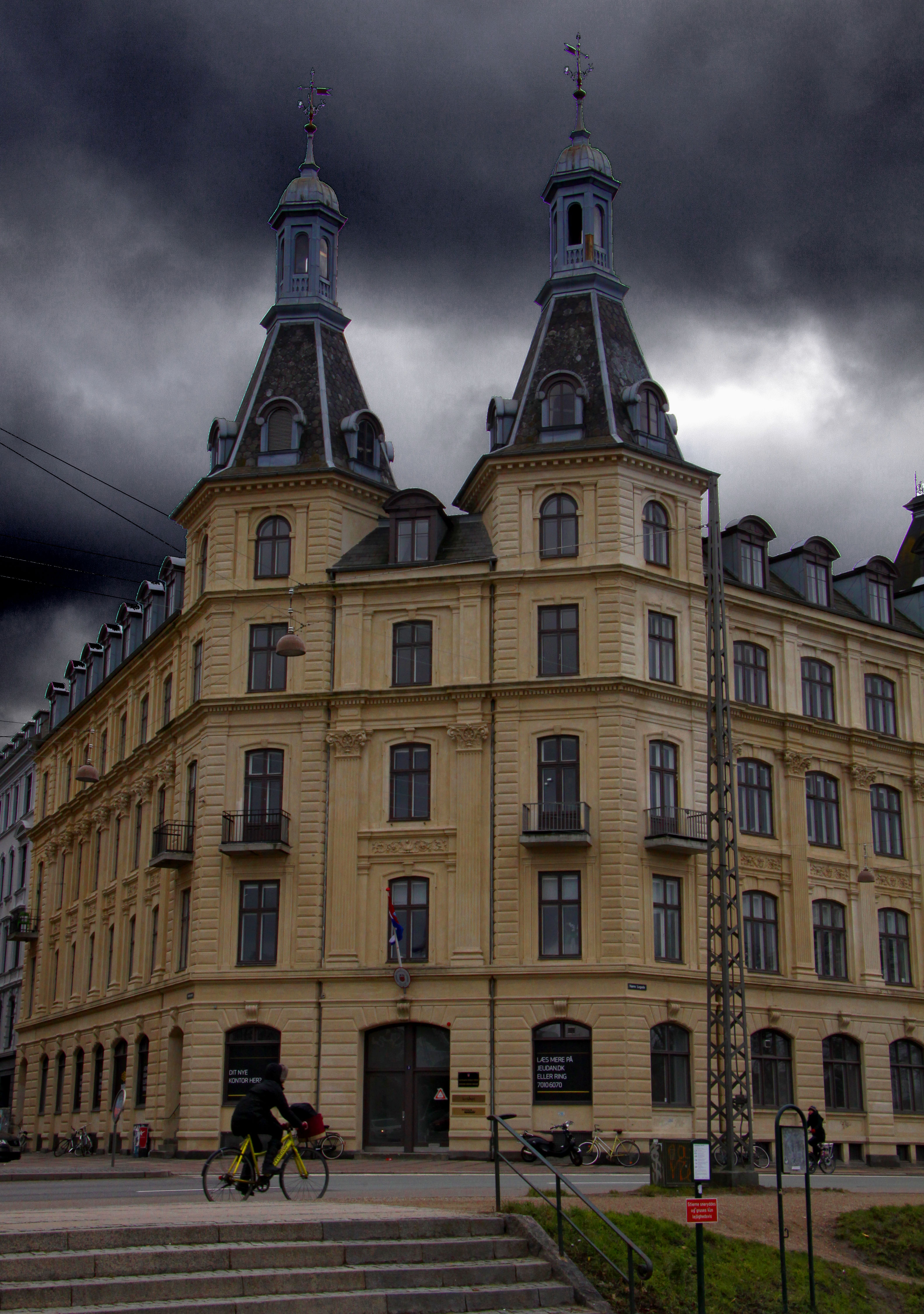
Embassy in Copenhagen

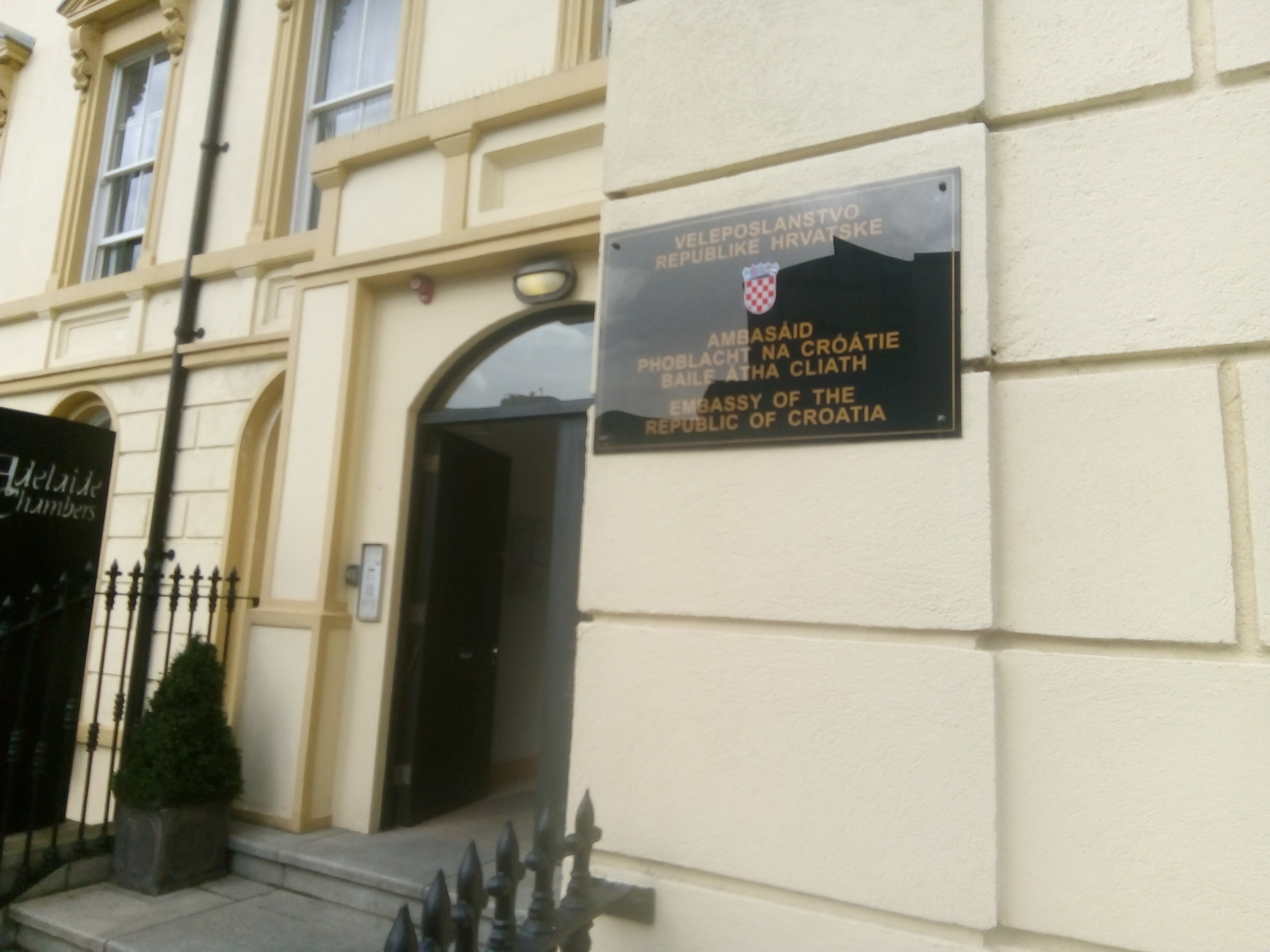
Embassy in Dublin

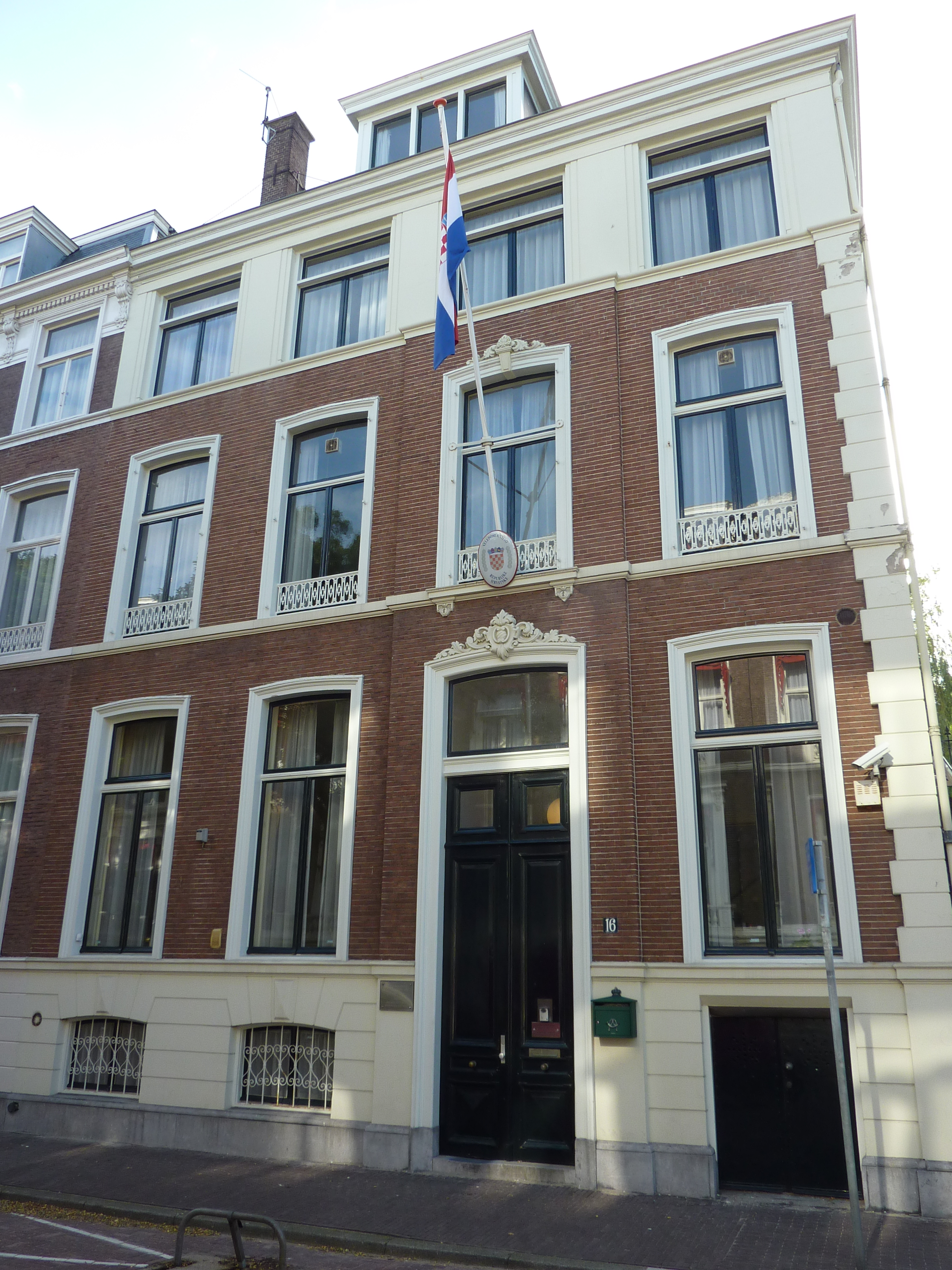
Embassy in The Hague

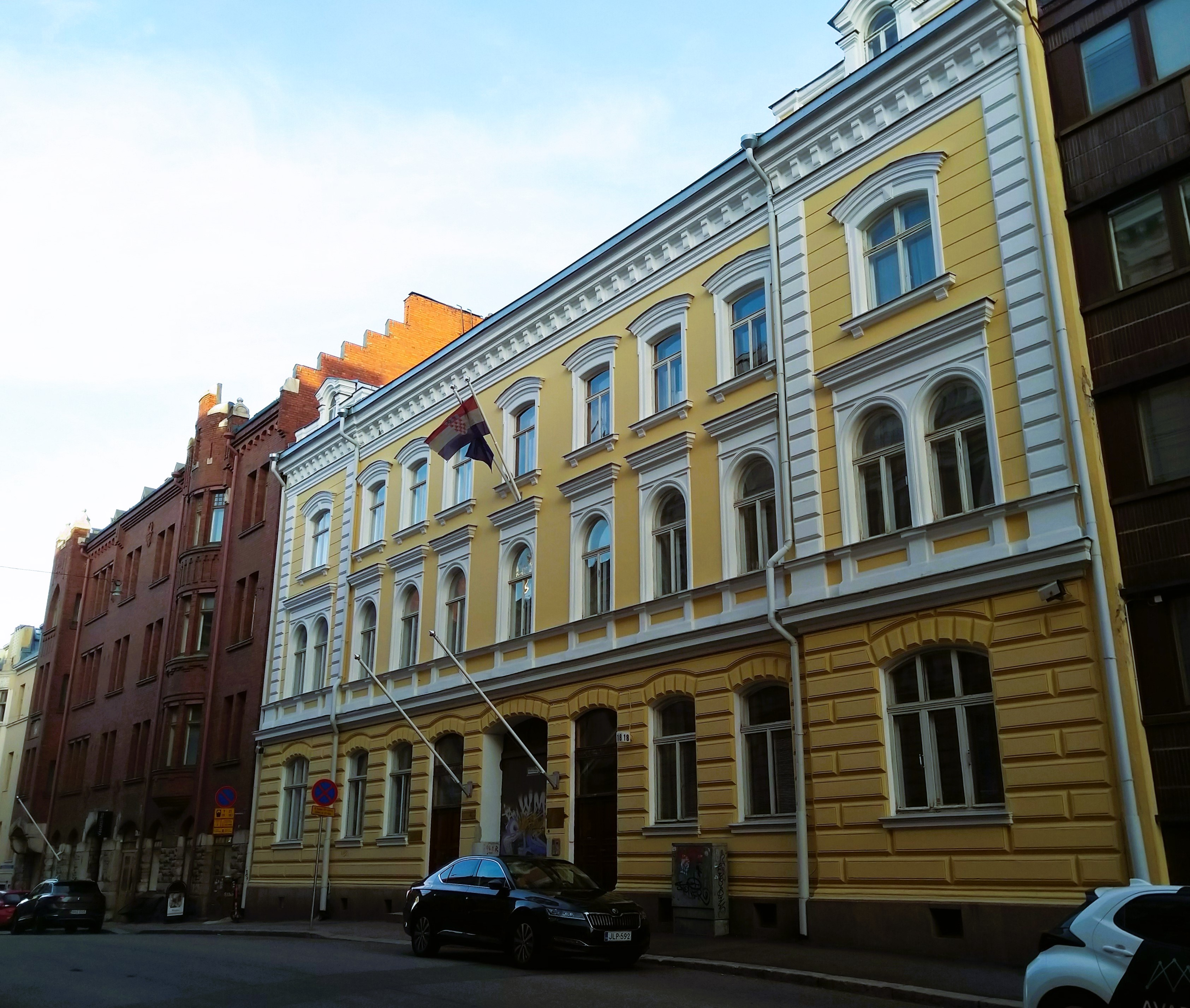
Embassy in Helsinki

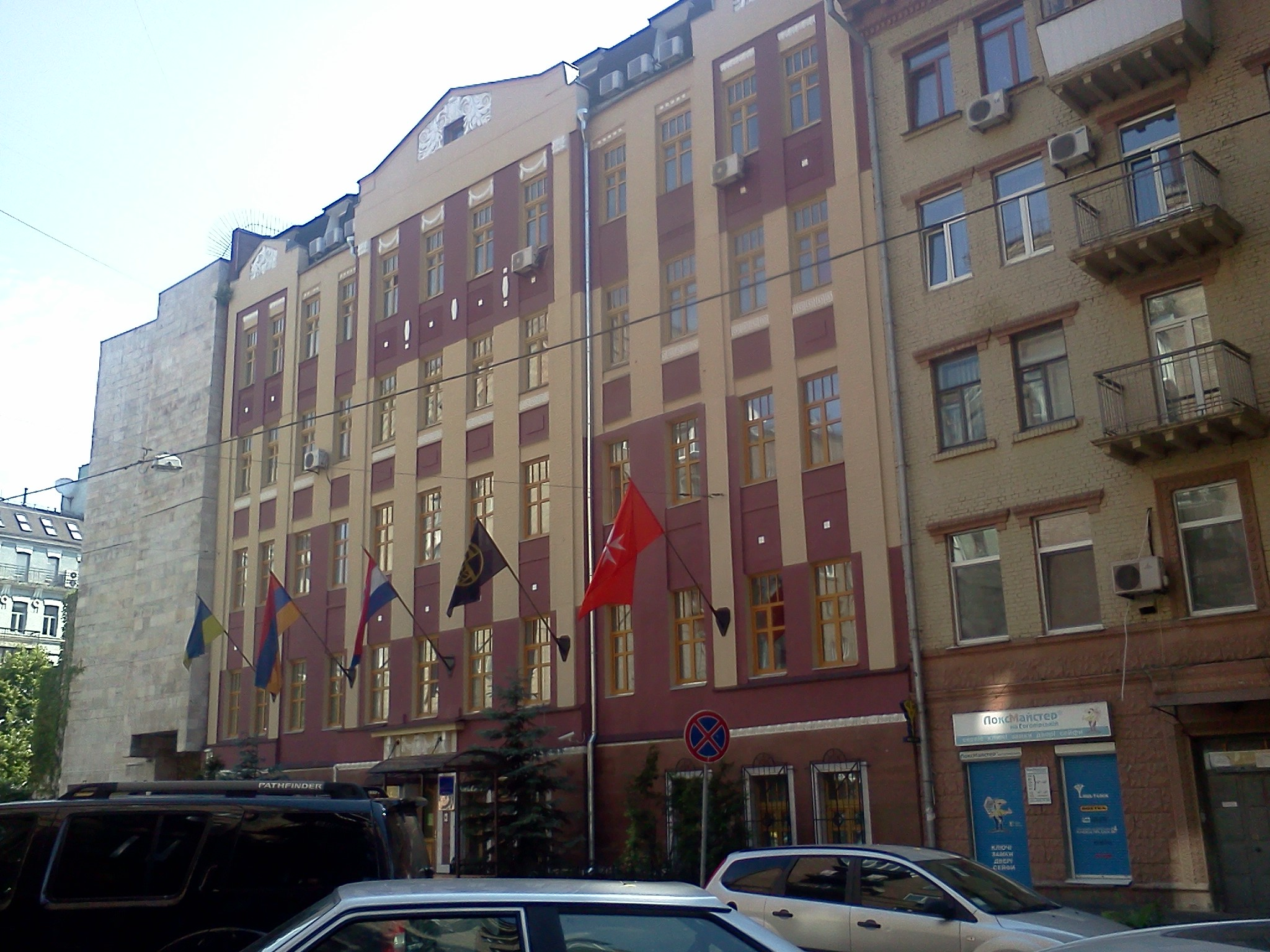
Embassy in Kiev

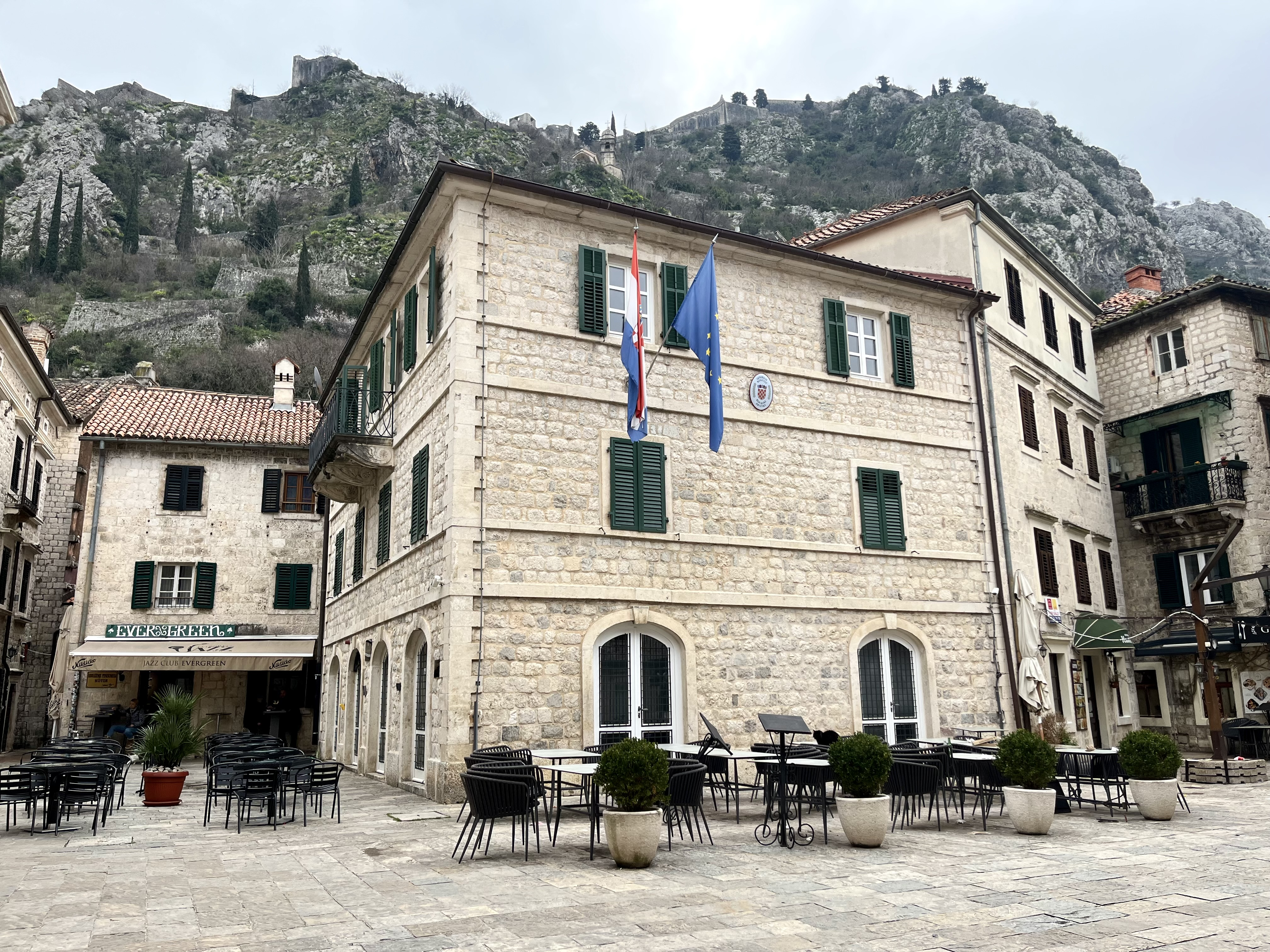
Consulate-General in Kotor

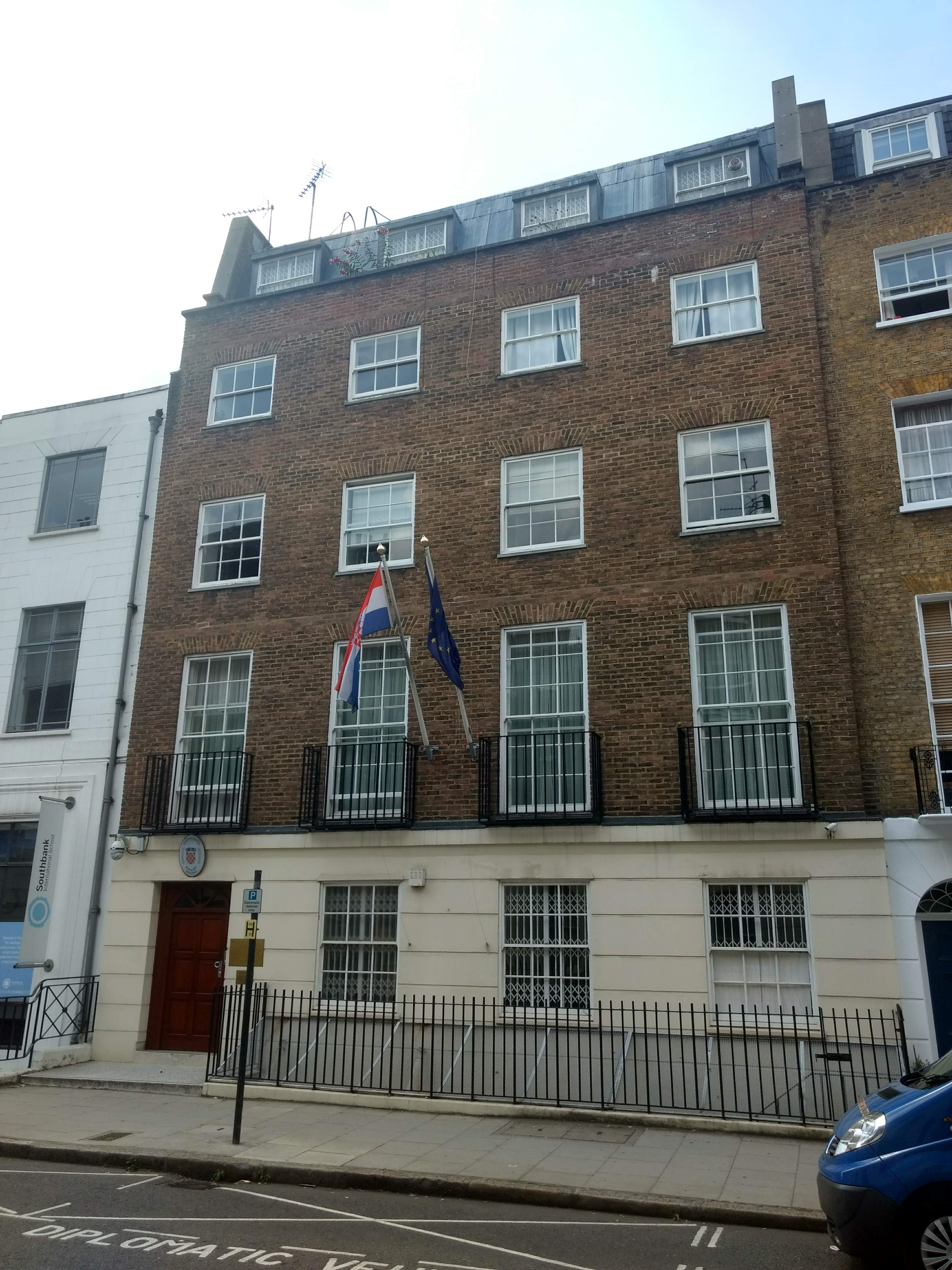
Embassy in London

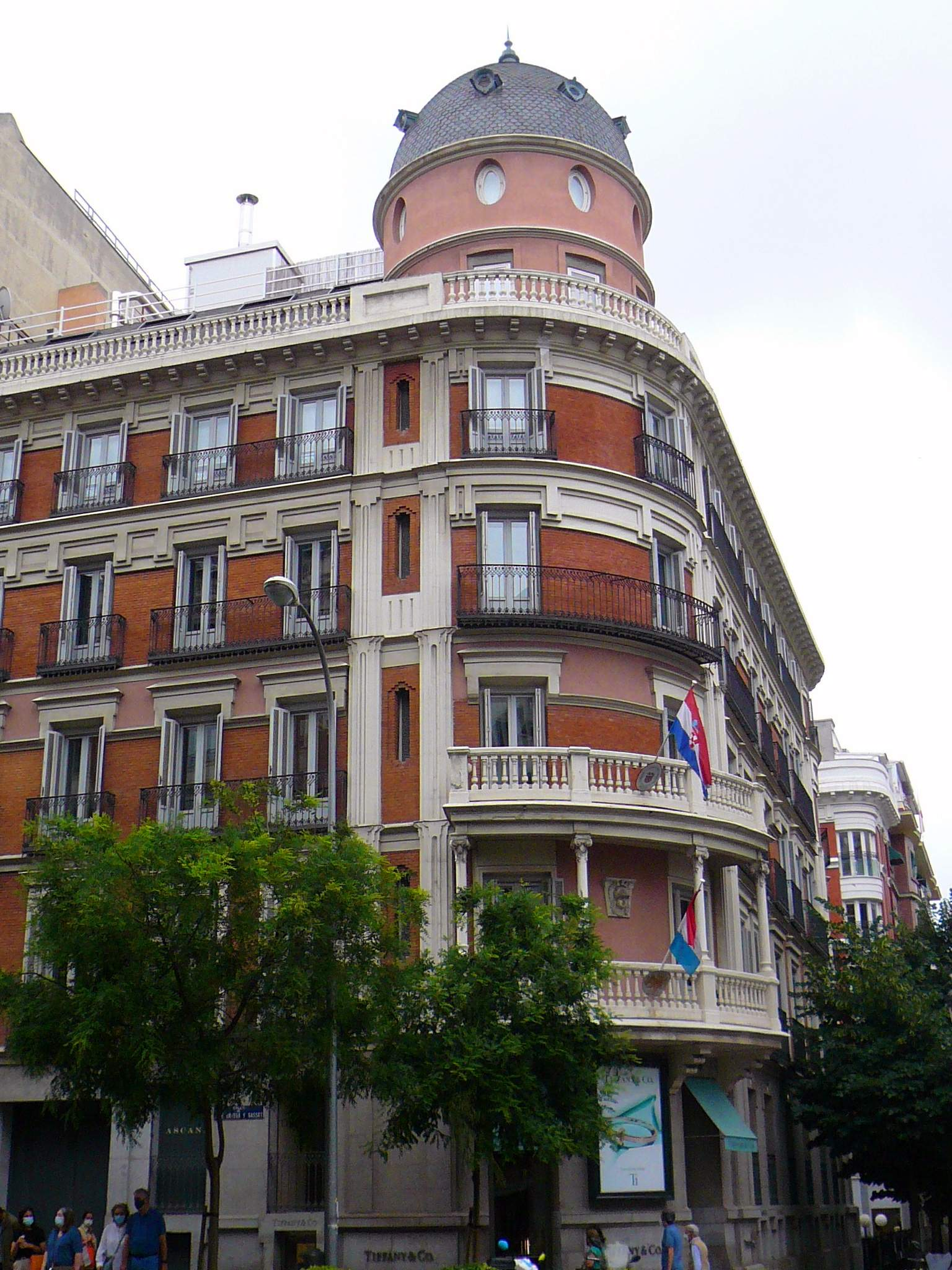
Embassy in Madrid

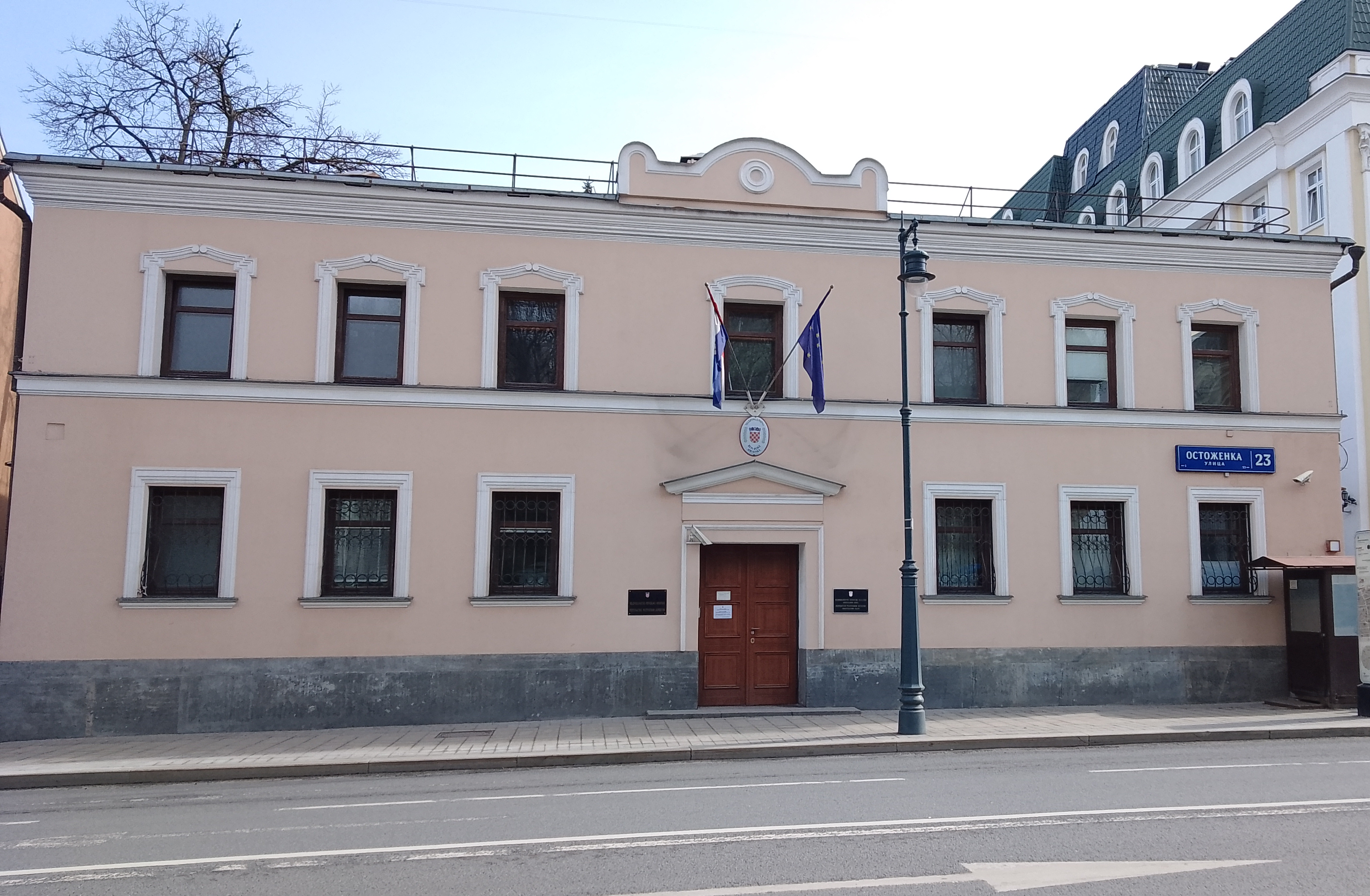
Embassy in Moscow

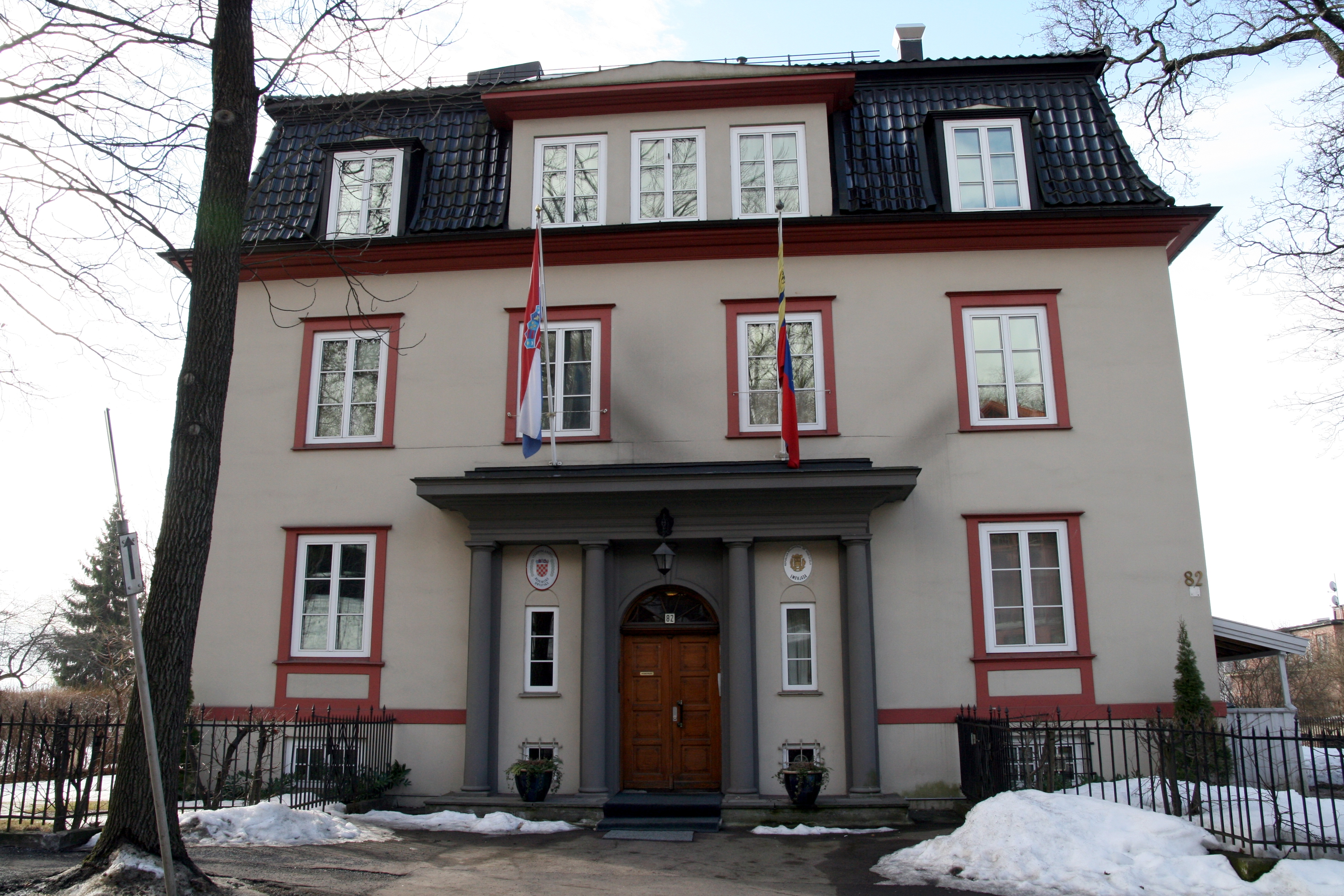
Embassy in Oslo

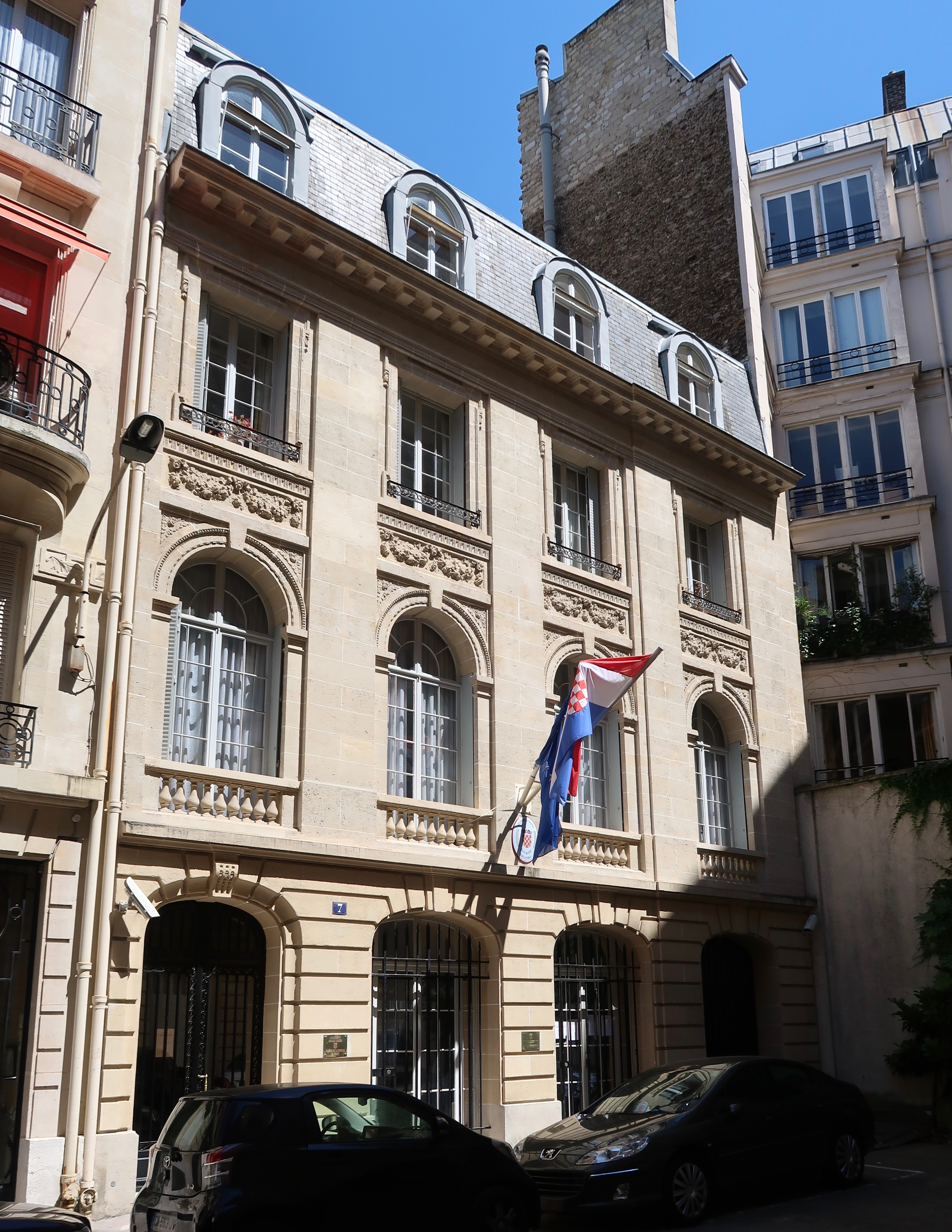
Embassy in Paris

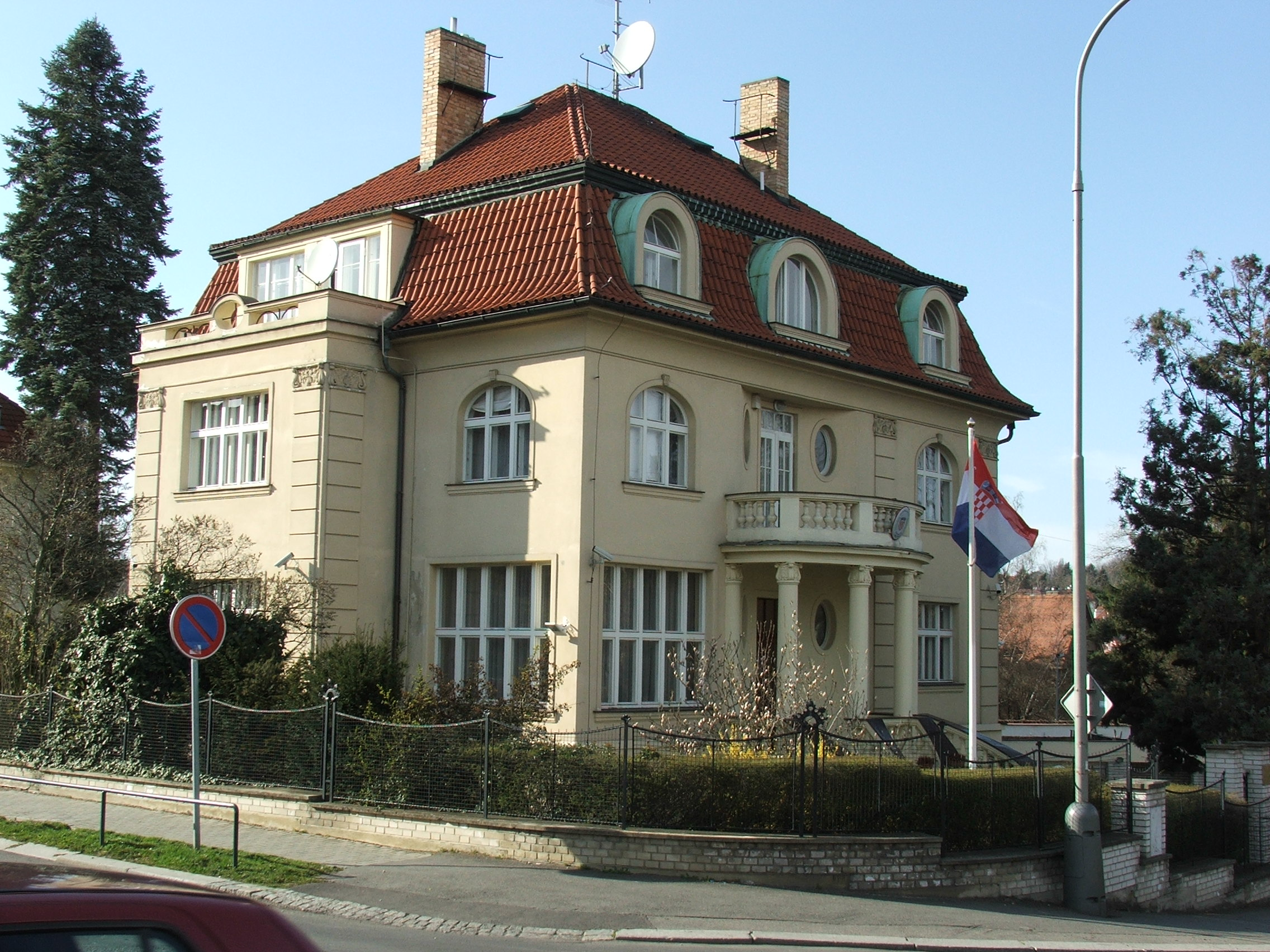
Embassy in Prague

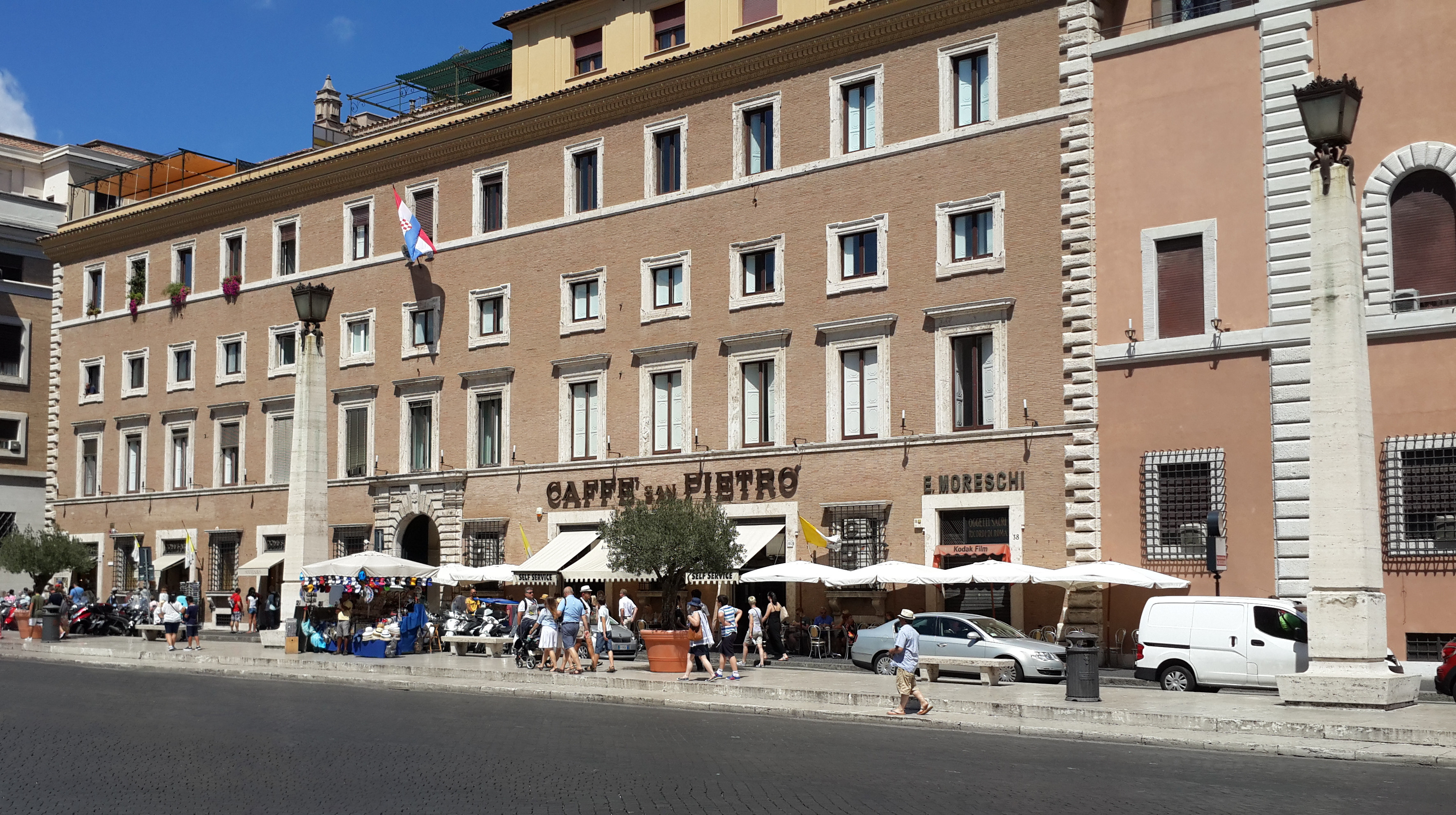
Embassy to the Holy See in Rome

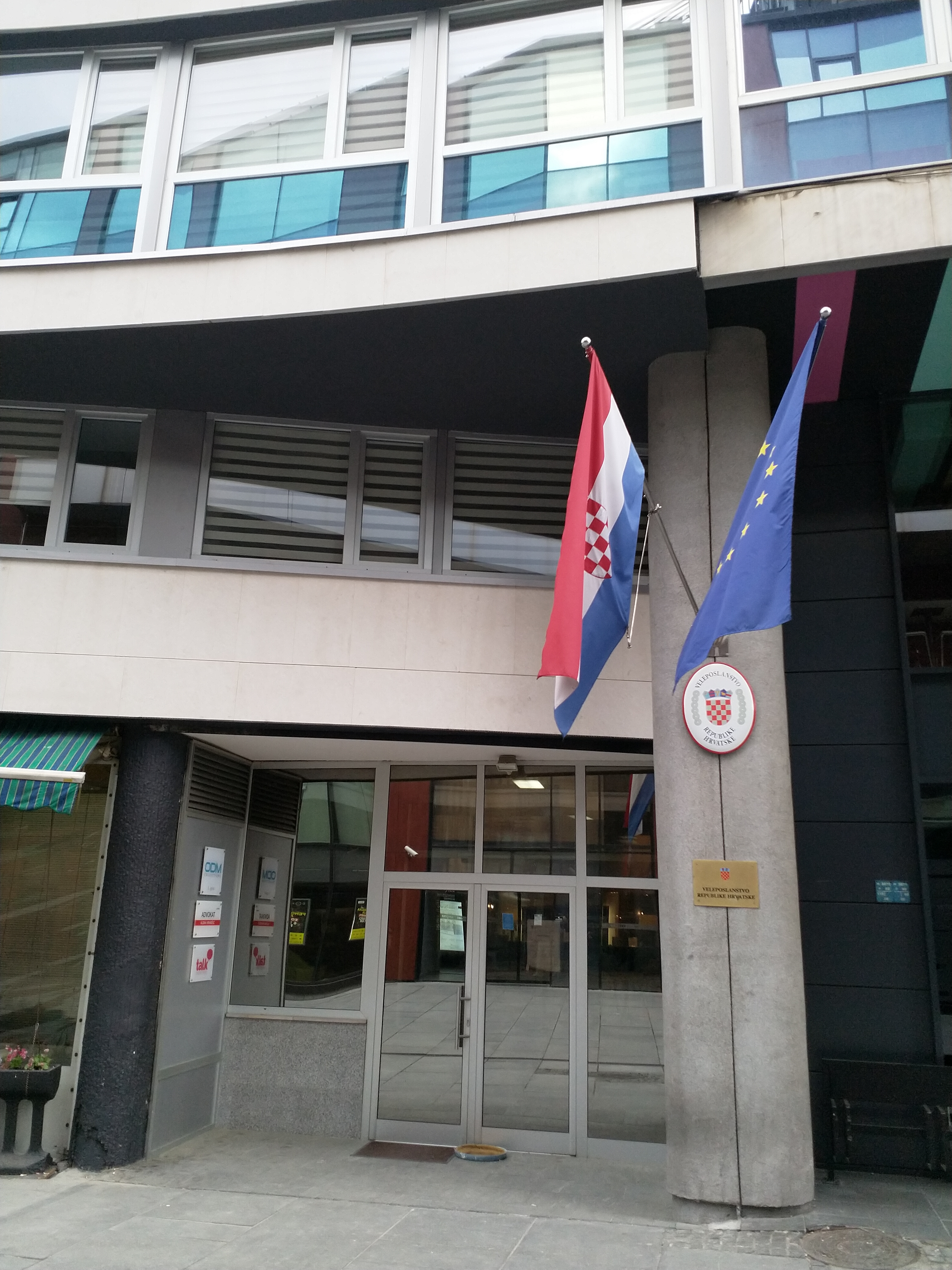
Embassy in Sarajevo

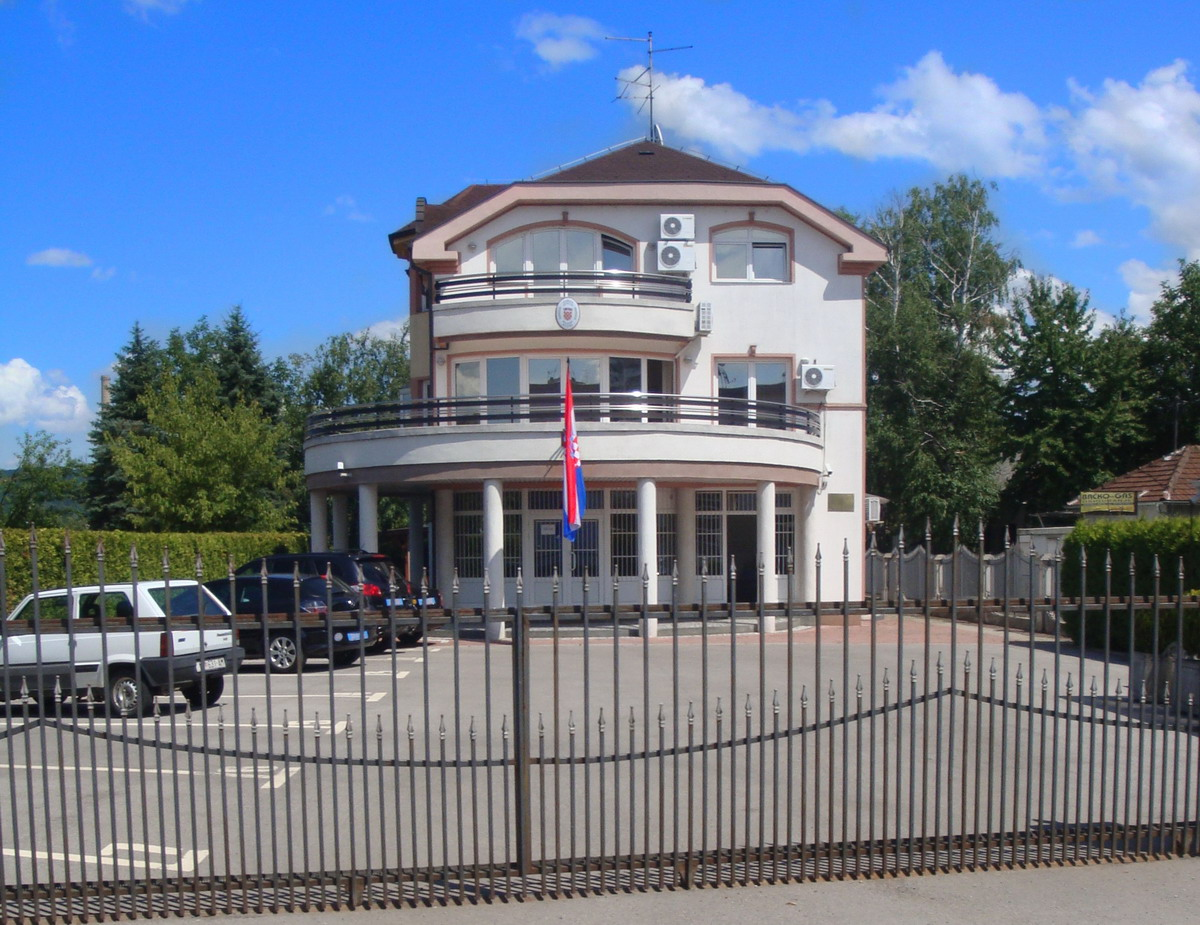
Consulate-General in Banja Luka

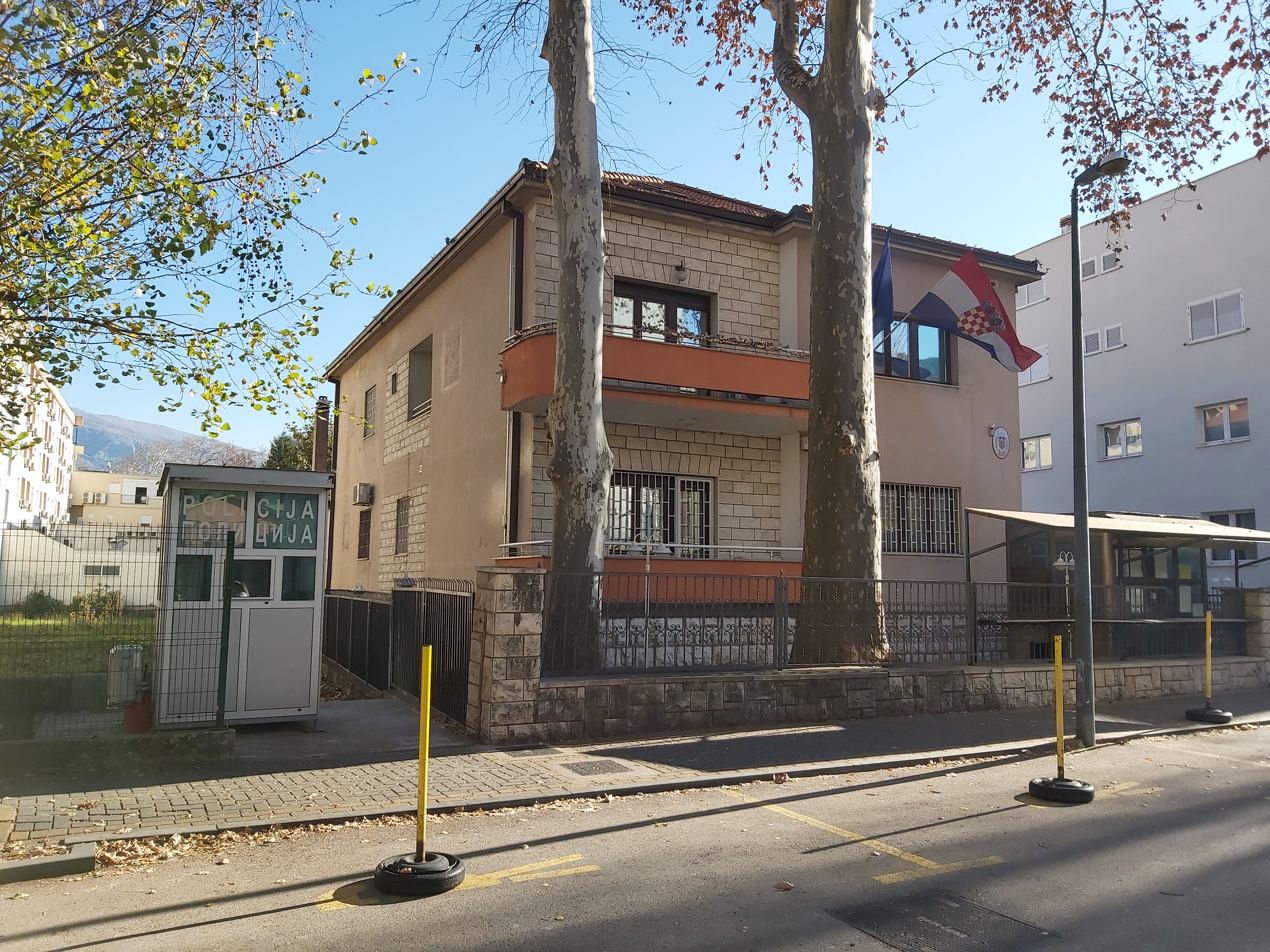
Consulate-General in Mostar

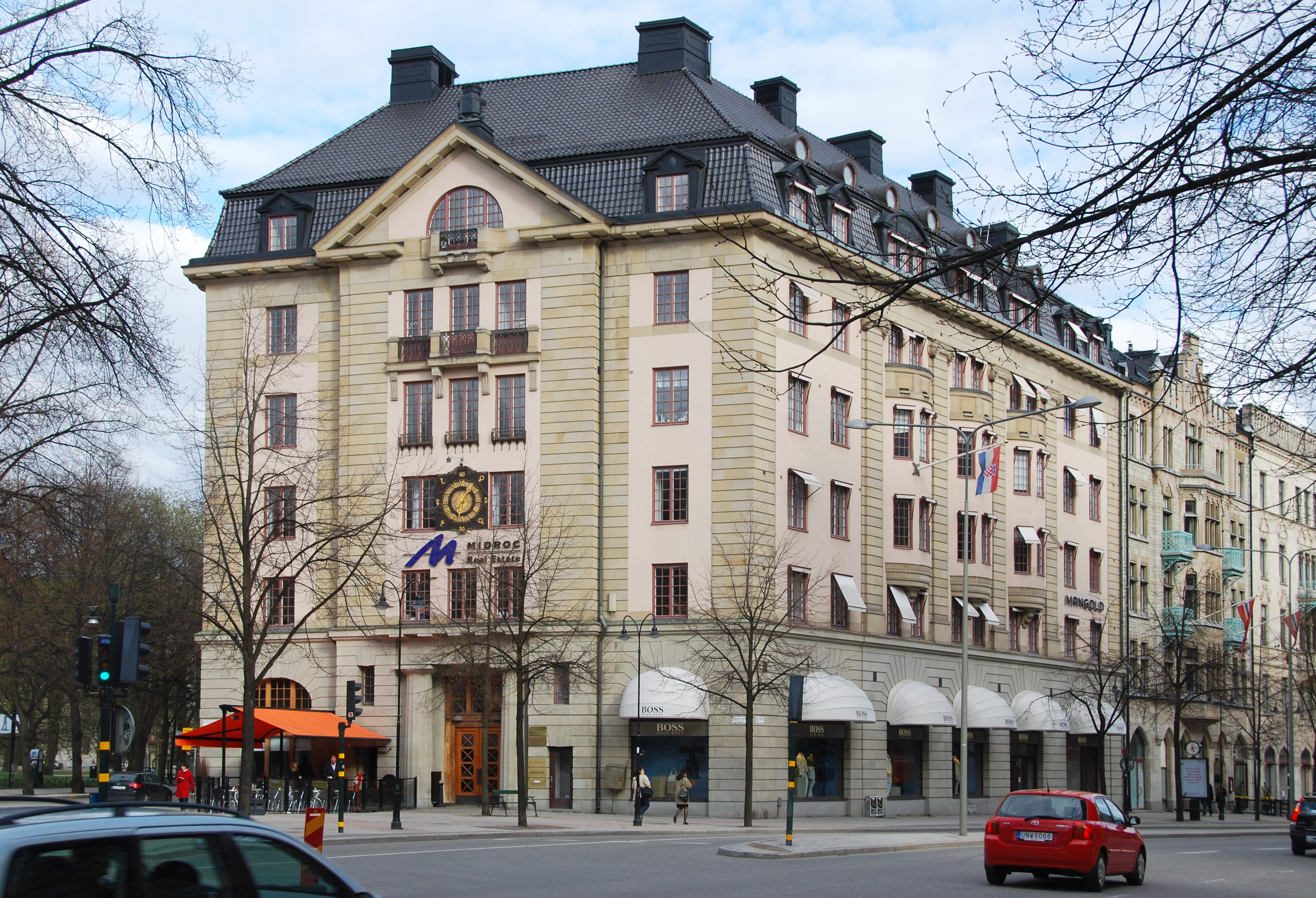
Embassy in Stockholm

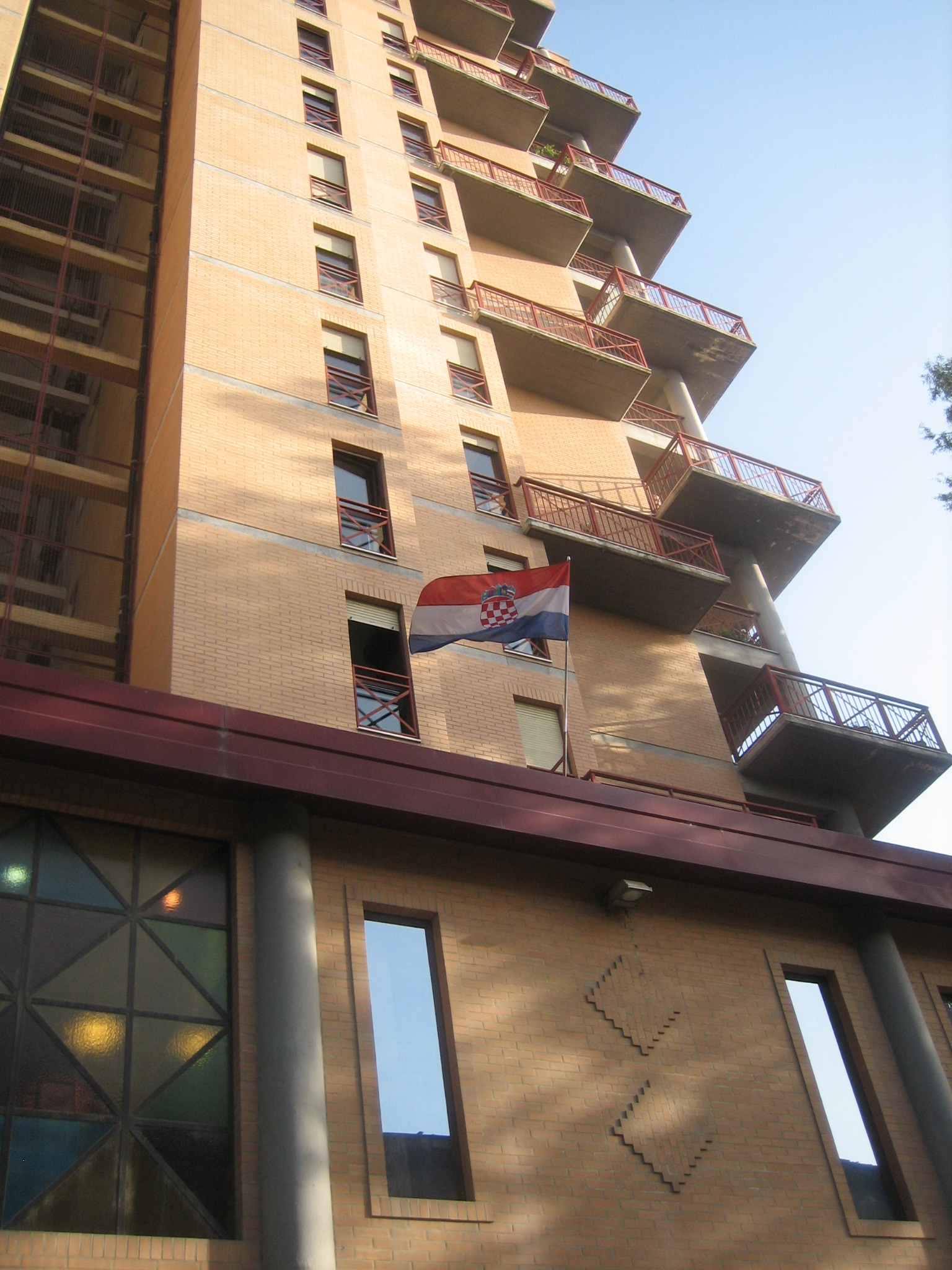
Embassy in Tirana

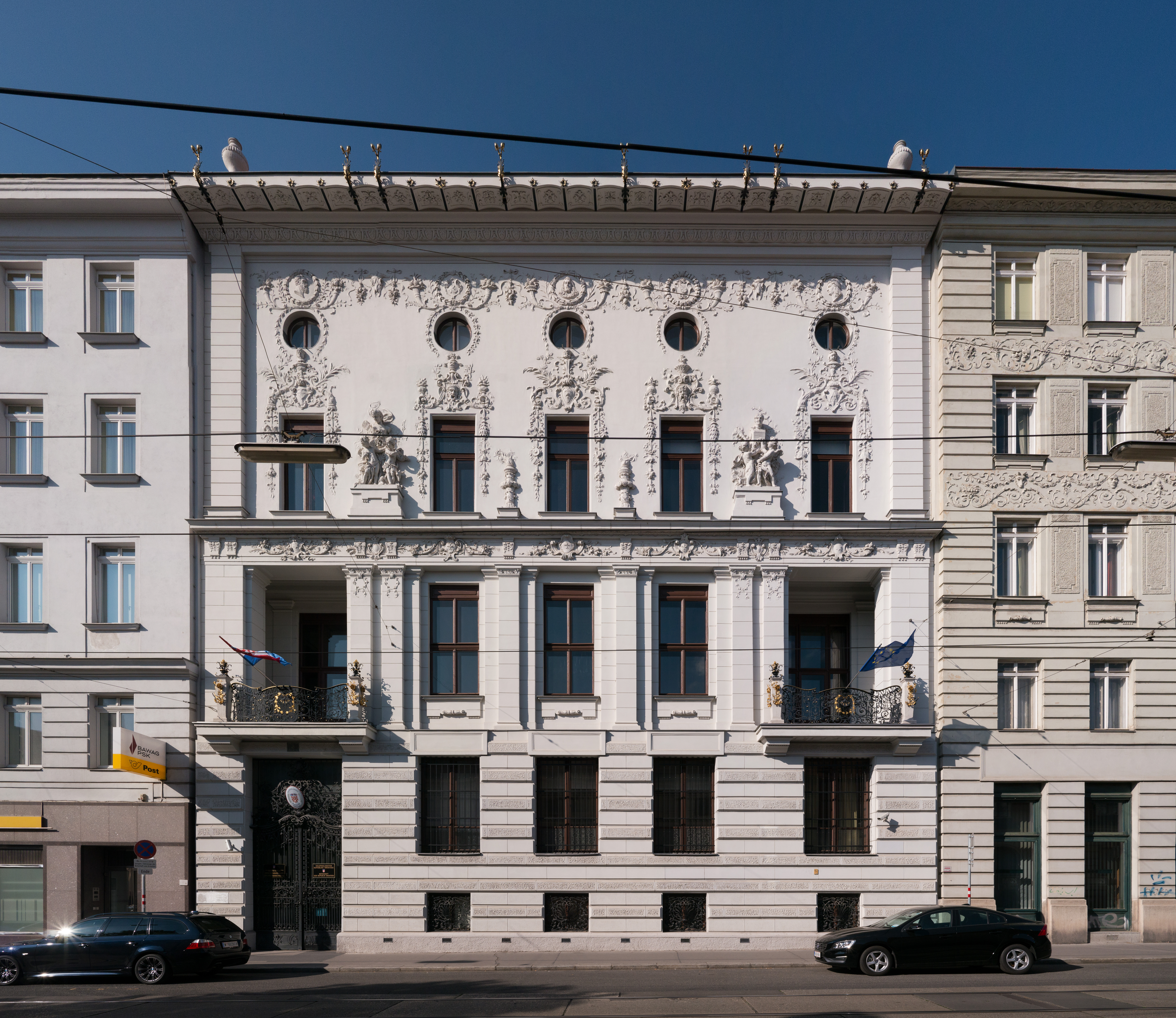
Embassy in Vienna

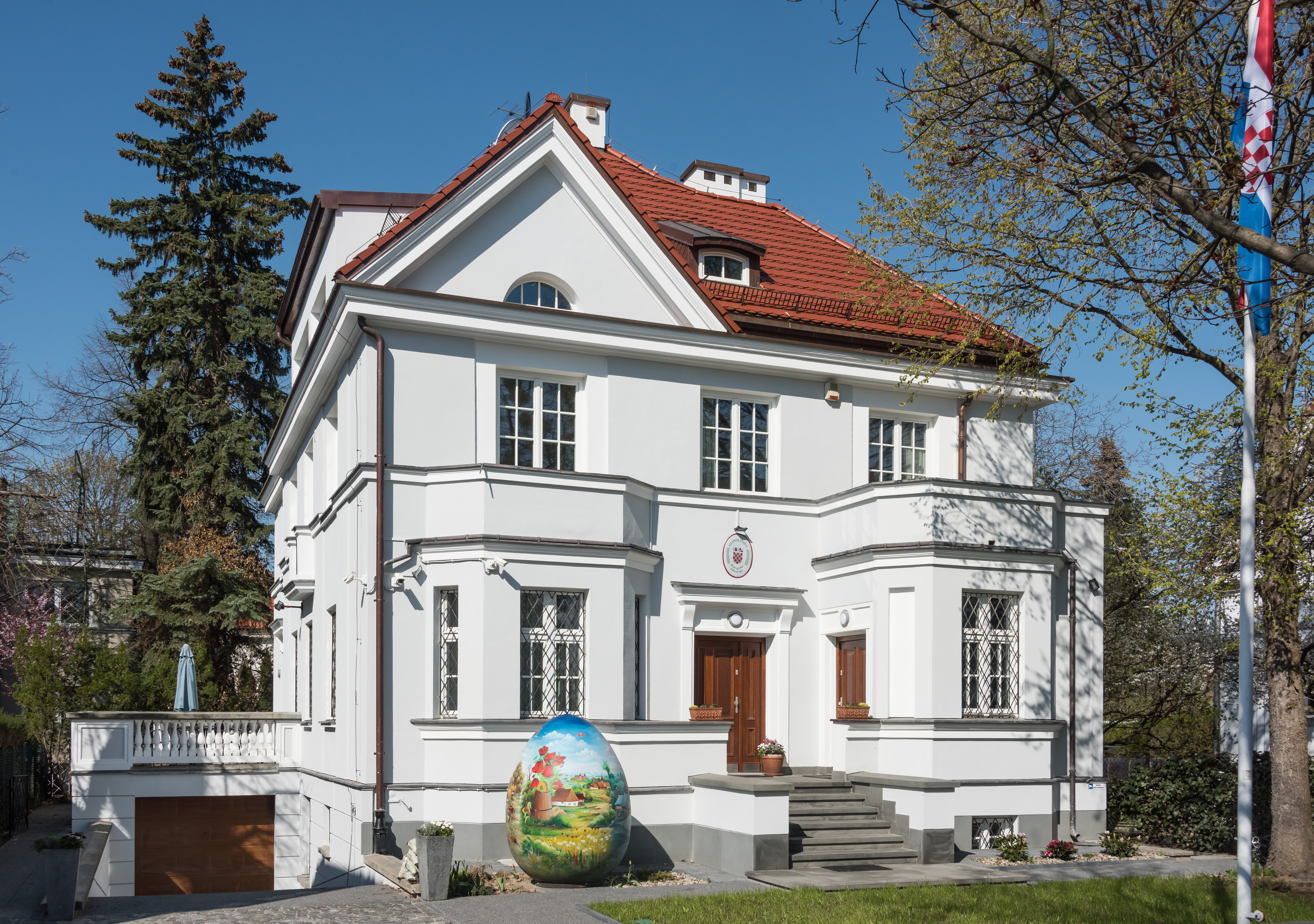
Embassy in Warsaw

=== Oceania ===
Host country	Host city	Mission	Concurrent accreditation	Ref.
Australia	Canberra	Embassy	Countries: Fiji; Kiribati; Nauru; New Zealand; Papua New Guinea; Samoa; Solomon Islands; Tuvalu; Vanuatu; Consular jurisdiction only: Tonga (Note: Tonga is listed only under the consular jurisdiction of the Croatian Embassy in Canberra. As of 2021, the two countries have yet to establish formal diplomatic relations.)	
Australia	Melbourne	Consulate–General	Countries: Fiji; Kiribati; Nauru; New Zealand; Papua New Guinea; Samoa; Solomon Islands; Tuvalu; Vanuatu; Consular jurisdiction only: Tonga	
Australia	Sydney	Consulate–General	Countries: Fiji; Kiribati; Nauru; New Zealand; Papua New Guinea; Samoa; Solomon Islands; Tuvalu; Vanuatu; Consular jurisdiction only: Tonga	
Australia	Perth	Consulate	Countries: Fiji; Kiribati; Nauru; New Zealand; Papua New Guinea; Samoa; Solomon Islands; Tuvalu; Vanuatu; Consular jurisdiction only: Tonga	

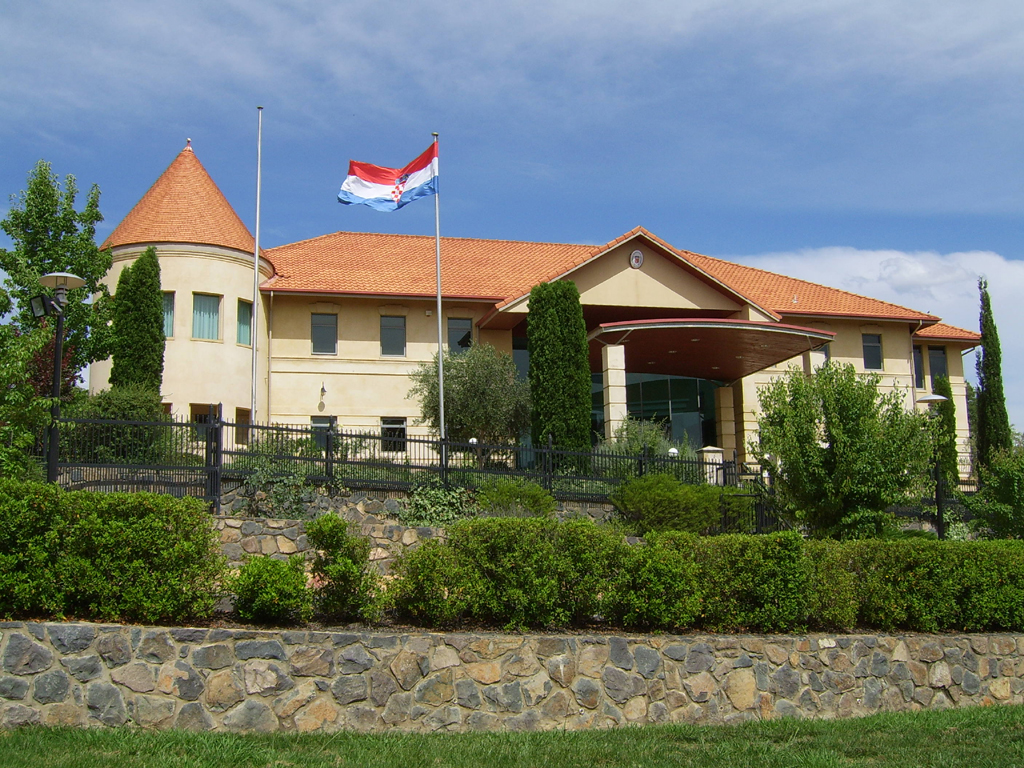
Embassy in Canberra

=== Multilateral organizations ===
Organization	Host city	Host country	Mission	Concurrent accreditation	Ref.
Council of Europe	Strasbourg	France	Permanent Mission		
European Union	Brussels	Belgium	Permanent Representation		
NATO	Brussels	Belgium	Permanent Delegation		
United Nations	New York City	United States	Permanent Mission	Countries: Antigua and Barbuda; Bahamas; Barbados; Belize; Costa Rica; Dominica; Dominican Republic; El Salvador; Grenada; Guyana; Guatemala; Haiti; Honduras; Jamaica; Nicaragua; Saint Kitts and Nevis; Saint Lucia; Saint Vincent and the Grenadines; Suriname	
United Nations	Geneva	Switzerland	Permanent Mission	International Organizations: World Trade Organization	
United Nations	Vienna	Austria	Permanent Mission	International Organizations: OSCE; International Atomic Energy Agency; UNIDO	
UNESCO	Paris	France	Permanent Mission		

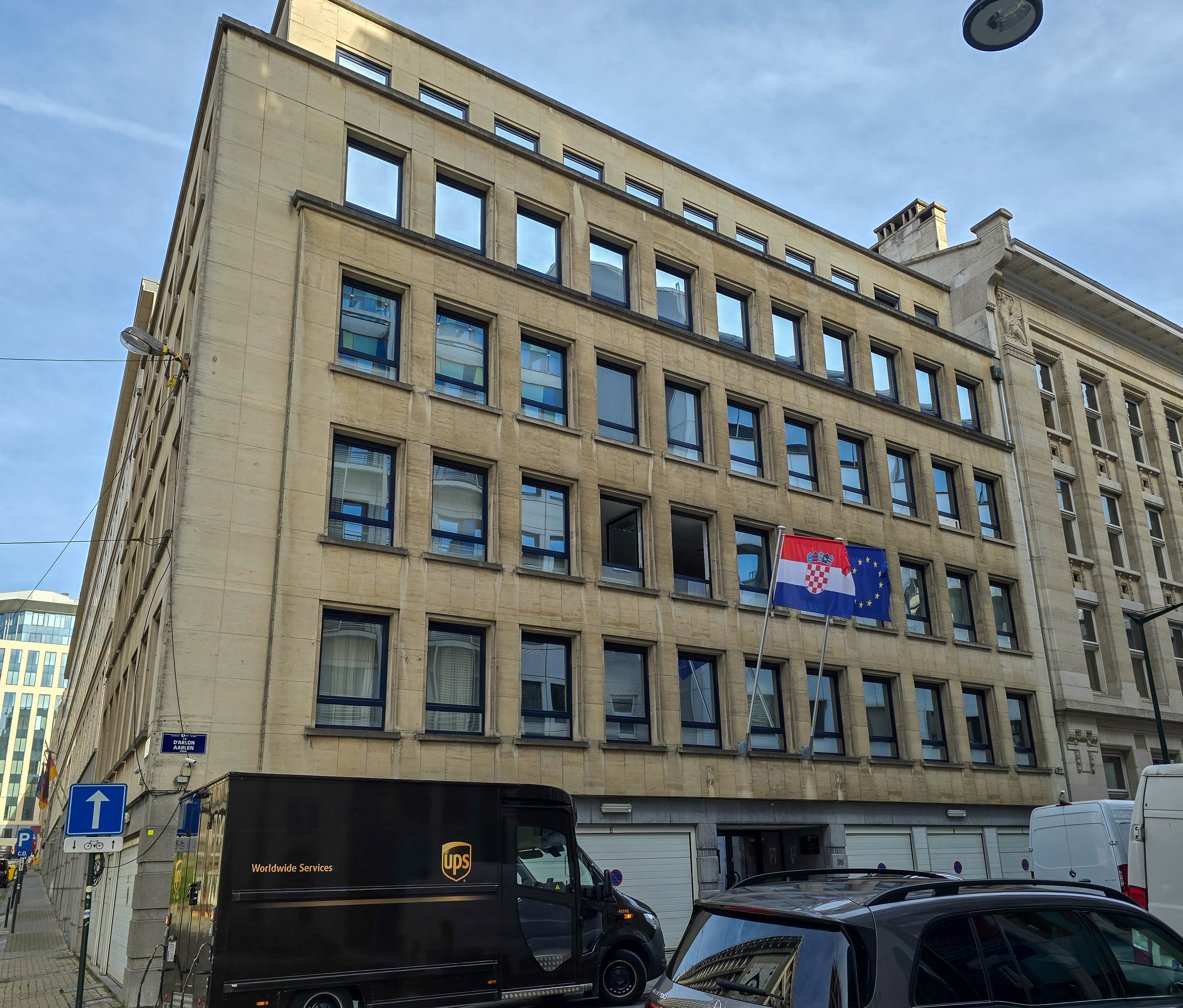
Permanent Mission to the European Union in Brussels

== Diplomatic missions to open ==
Host country	Host city	Mission	Ref.
Brazil	São Paulo	Consulate-General	
Canada	Vancouver	Consulate-General	
Kenya	Nairobi	Embassy	
Mexico	Mexico City	Embassy	
New Zealand	Wellington	Embassy	
Peru	Lima	Embassy	

== Closed missions ==
=== Africa ===
Host country	Host city	Mission	Year closed	Ref.
Libya	Tripoli	Embassy (Note: Resident in Cairo, Egypt.)	2011	

== See also ==
- Foreign relations of Croatia
- List of diplomatic missions in Croatia
- Ambassadors of Croatia
