= Palais Hoyos =

Building and Embassy consulate in Vienna, Austria

Coordinates: 48°11′53″N 16°22′42″E

Embassy of Croatia, Vienna
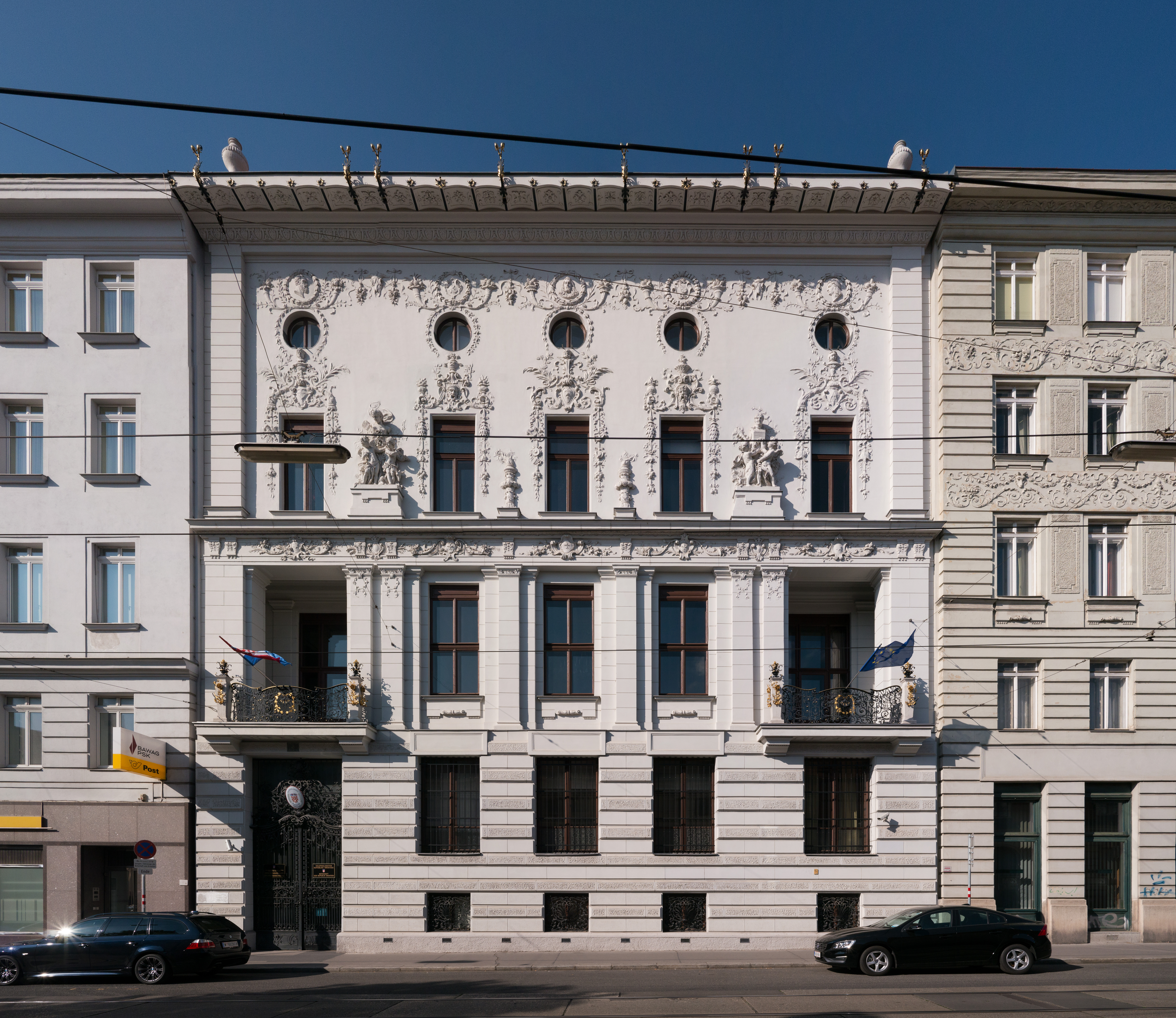
- Location: Vienna, Austria
- Address: Rennweg 3
- Ambassador: Daniel Glunčić

Palais Hoyos is an Art Nouveau building in the Landstraße district of Vienna, Austria. Currently it serves as Croatian Embassy in Austria.

== History ==
The palace was built, together with two other buildings, by Otto Wagner at the end of the 19th century. The style of the Historicism was pursued during the realisation of the palace and the facade is Rococo and Vienna Secession (Art Nouveau).

Wagner kept the building in the middle, Rennweg 3 (Palais Hoyos), for himself, while Gustav Mahler lived in the adjacent building, Rennweg 5, from 1898 to 1909.

The site once housed the Trinity hospital and the barracks of the k. k. adelig-polnischen Leibgarde military unit, which were called the Arcièren-Leibgarde later on.

In 1903, the palace was bought by the widowed countess Marie Hoyos. The Hoyos family owned another palace in the Ringstraße, which is nowadays known as Hotel Bristol.

In 1957, the palace in Rennweg was sold by the Hoyos family to Yugoslavia, in order to serve as its embassy in Austria. After the breakup of Yugoslavia, the building became the possession of Serbia, serving the same purpose.

Following the agreement of Yugoslav successor states on the distribution of former country's foreign assets in 2011, the building passed on to Croatia. In 2013, Croatian Ministry of Foreign Affairs started a major renovation (4.6 million kuna, or over 600,000 euro) in order to move the Croatian embassy there from Heuberggasse 10.
