= Embassy of Croatia, Belgrade =

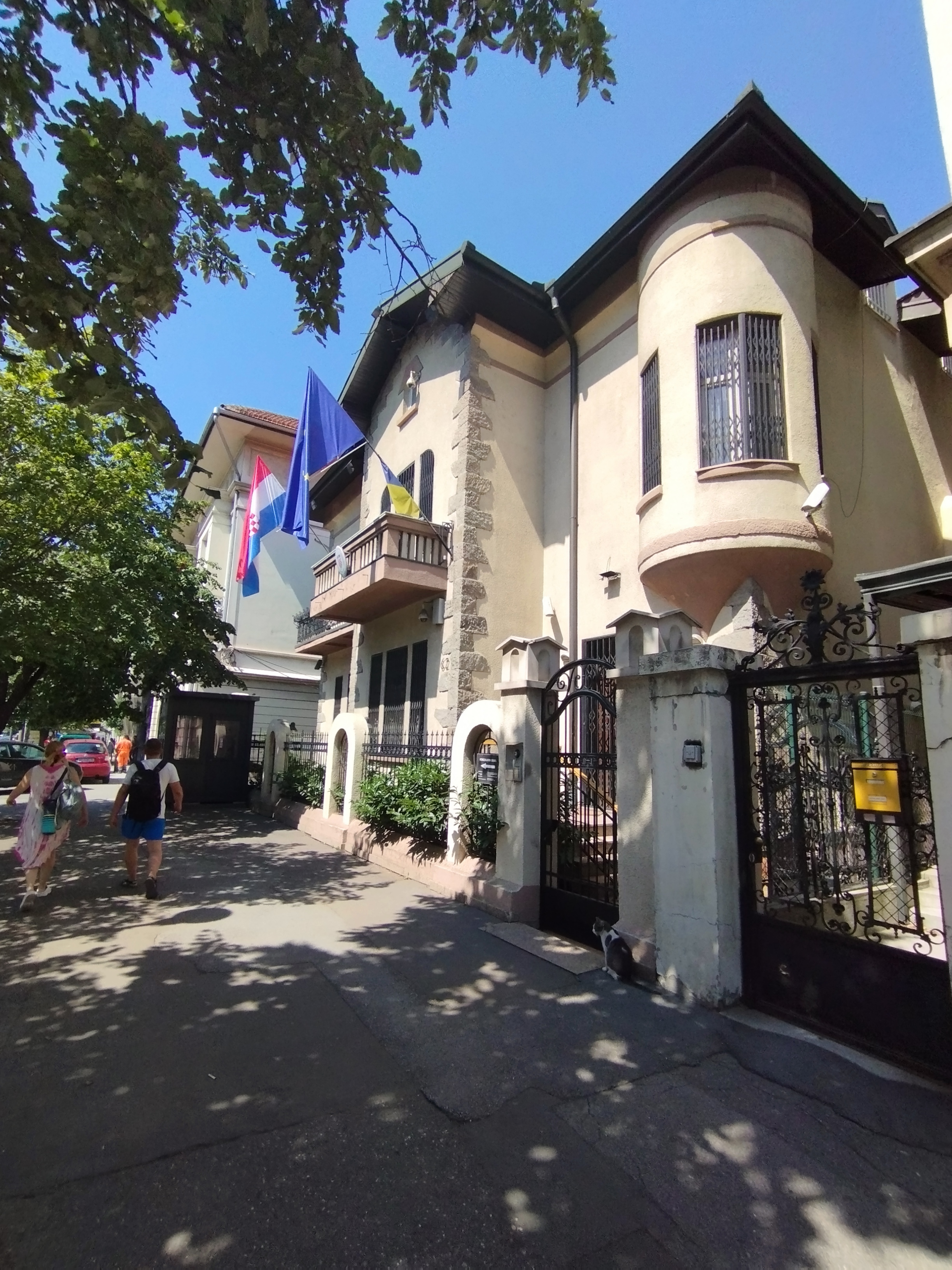
- Location: Belgrade, Serbia
- Address: Kneza Miloša Street 62
- Ambassador: Hidajet Biščević

The Embassy of Croatia in Belgrade is the diplomatic mission of Croatia in the Serbia.

== History ==
The first proposals to establish formal diplomatic relations and open the embassy in Belgrade came as early as 1992, during talks between Croatian President Franjo Tuđman and FR Yugoslavia's President Dobrica Ćosić. Subsequent talks between Tuđman and Slobodan Milošević in 1993 did not lead to progress due to Serbia's refusal to recognize the borders of the Republic of Croatia, which were disputed by the secessionist Republic of Serbian Krajina. The two countries established diplomatic relations on September 9, 1996, following mutual recognition after the end of the Croatian War of Independence and the signing of the Erdut Agreement. The embassy was eventually opened in the Archdiocese Palace, at Kneza Miloša Street 62, in the centre of Belgrade.

The building of the embassy was the target of a vandalism attack, along with the neighbouring embassies of the United States and Germany, when Kosovo unilaterally declared independence from Serbia in February 2008. In February 2022, a fire broke out in the residential building of the embassy in Senjak, which was extinguished by 21 firefighters. It was determined that the fire was not set intentionally. In November 2023, the Government of Serbia declared the first secretary of the Croatian embassy, Hrvoje Šnajder, a persona non grata.
