= List of ambassadors of Croatia to the United States =

Croatian Ambassador to the United States
- Izvanredni i opunomoćeni veleposlanik Republike Hrvatske u Sjedinjenim Američkim Državama; Veleposlanstvo Republike Hrvatske u Washingtonu

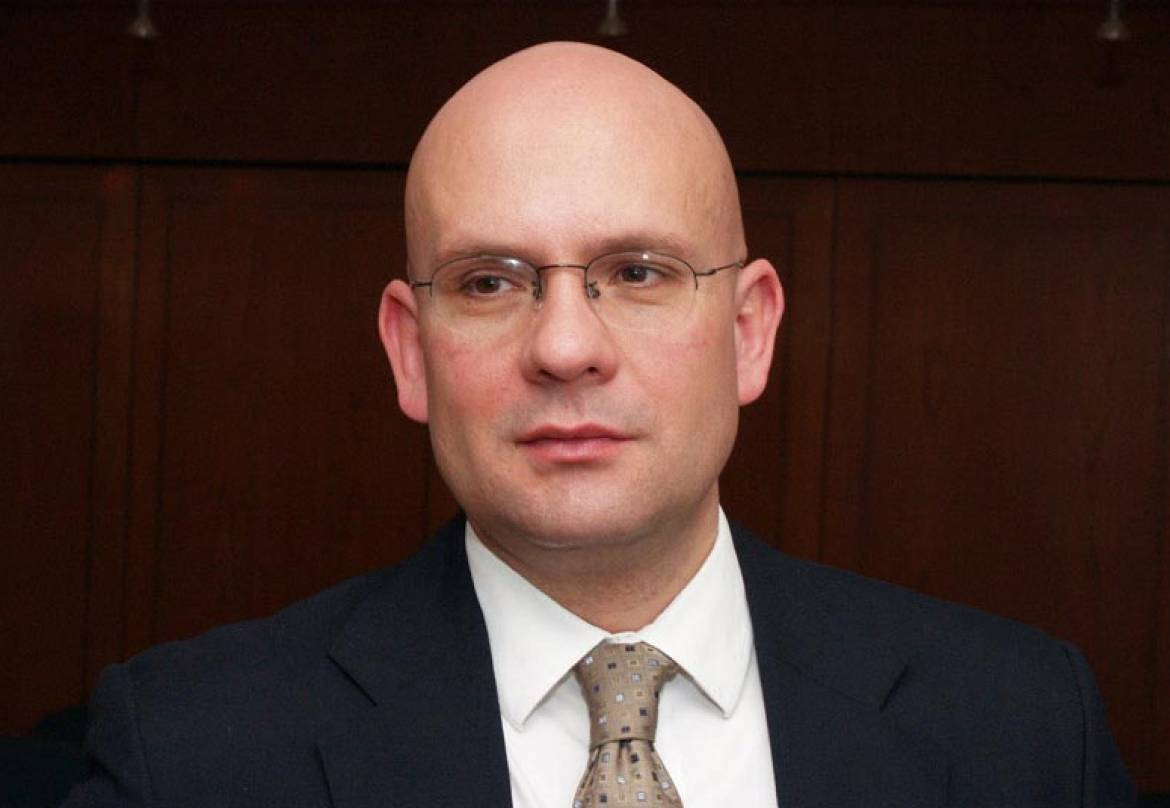
- Incumbent; Pjer Šimunović since September 8, 2017
- Inaugural holder: Petar Šarčević
- Formation: November 19, 1992

The Croatian Ambassador to the United States oversees the diplomatic protocol and bilateral relations of Croatia and the United States. The office was created on April 7, 1992, following the independence of Croatia with an initial U.S. presence in Croatia dating back to May 9, 1946, in the capital city of Zagreb. Croatia has an embassy in Washington, D.C., with general consulates in Chicago, Los Angeles, and New York City. The U.S. has an embassy in Zagreb.

	Diplomatic agrément	Diplomatic accreditation	Ambassador	President of Croatia	Prime Minister of Croatia	U.S. President	Notes
	August 1, 1992			Franjo Tuđman	Franjo Gregurić	George H. W. Bush	Diplomatic relations established
1	October 7, 1992	November 19, 1992	Petar A. Šarčević	Franjo Tuđman	Franjo Gregurić	George H. W. Bush	Born on 26 April 1941 in Subotica. Completed law studies at University of Zagreb in 1965 and commenced postgraduate studies European Integration at the University of Amsterdam. He acquired his Dr. iur. at the Faculty of Law and Economics of the University of Mainz. He is married to Professor Susan Šarčević, a former partner in his professional career.
2	February 1, 1996	February 6, 1996	Miomir Žužul	Franjo Tuđman	Zlatko Mateša	Bill Clinton	Named as ambassador to the United States after a disagreement with Foreign Minister Mate Granić. Žužul declared that he would seek reconciliation with Croatia's former enemies and also invited NATO to establish bases in Croatia as a prelude to the country's membership in the alliance.
3	December 7, 2000	February 14, 2001	Ivan Grdešić	Stjepan Mesić	Ivica Račan	Bill Clinton	
4	July 20, 2004	September 15, 2004	Neven Jurica	Stjepan Mesić	Ivo Sanader	George W. Bush	
5	April 7, 2008	April 9, 2008	Kolinda Grabar-Kitarović	Stjepan Mesić	Ivo Sanader	George W. Bush	
6	April 20, 2012	May 2, 2012	Josip Paro	Ivo Josipović	Zoran Milanović	Barack Obama	
7	September 1, 2017	September 8, 2017	Pjer Šimunović	Kolinda Grabar-Kitarović	Andrej Plenković	Donald Trump	

== See also ==
- List of diplomatic missions of Croatia
- List of diplomatic missions in Croatia
- List of ambassadors of the United States to Croatia
