= Croatia–United States relations =

- Croatia: United States

Diplomatic mission
- Croatian Embassy, Washington D.C.: United States Embassy, Zagreb

Envoy
- Ambassador Pjer Šimunović: Ambassador; Nicole McGraw

The foreign, diplomatic, economic, and political relations between Croatia and the United States were established on April 7, 1992, following the independence of Croatia. By the late-1990s, the U.S. established Croatia as its strongest geopolitical connection to Southeast Europe. Modern relations are considered to be warm and friendly, with stalwart bilateral collaboration. The Croatian diaspora in the U.S. is the largest, estimated to be around 1.2 million which, in part, informs the foreign policy of Croatia. The two nations have strong connectivity through tourism, immigration, foreign aid, and economic mutualism.

Croatia and the U.S. are close military allies and share a robust bilateral defense industrial base. U.S. interests in Croatia are centered on the state's stabilizing influence in the region and extending the global reach of jointly-held Western ideals. The U.S. trained and equipped the Croatian Armed Forces in joint-initiation of Operation Storm during the Croatian War of Independence, helping to secure much of modern Croatian borders. Both collaborate closely on counterterrorism and are members of the military alliance NATO.

Both nations are part of the United Nations (UN), Euro-Atlantic Partnership Council, Organization for Security and Co-operation in Europe, International Monetary Fund, World Bank and World Trade Organization. Croatia has an embassy in Washington, D.C., with general consulates in Chicago, Los Angeles, and New York City. The U.S. has an embassy in Zagreb.

== Embassy ==
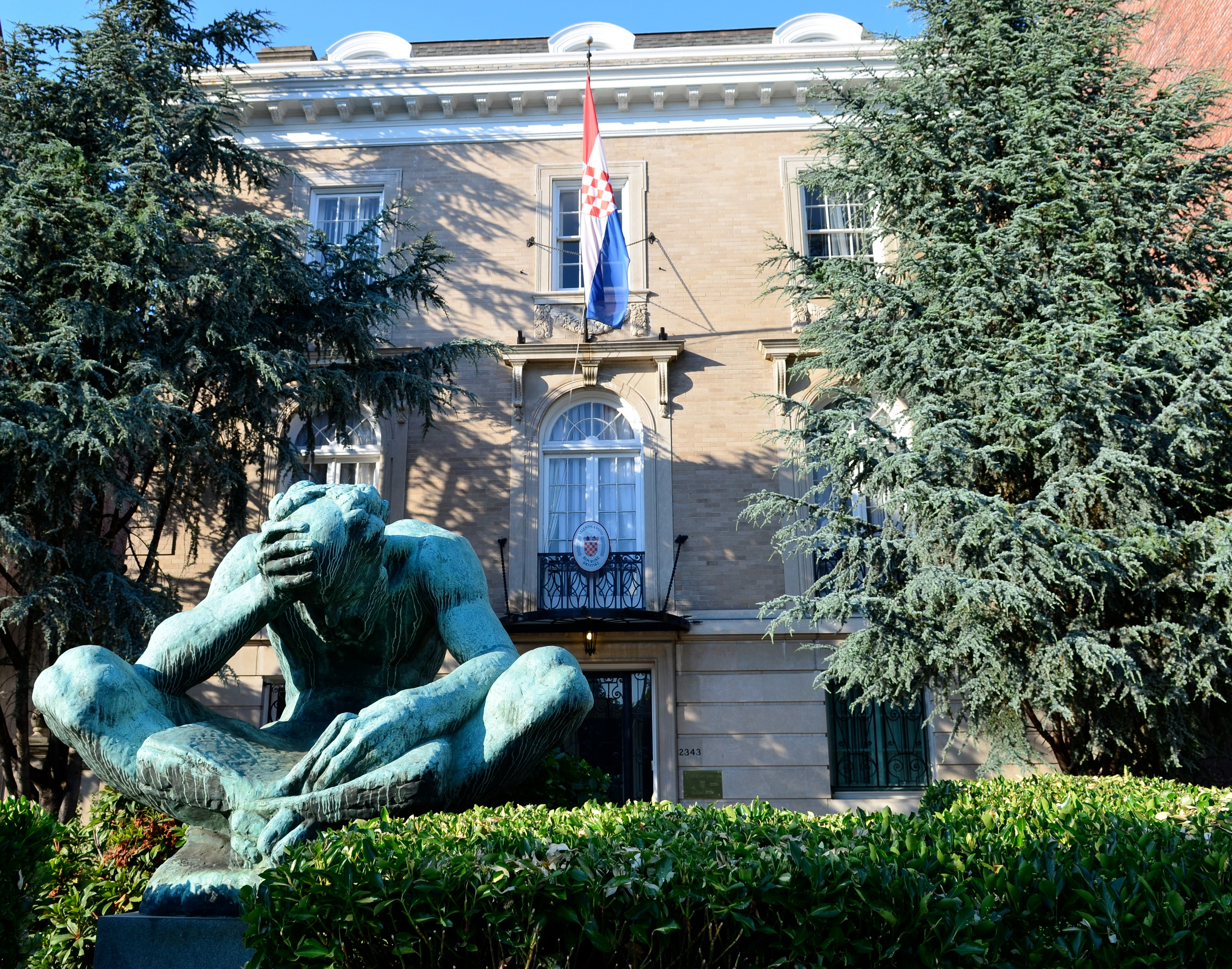
Embassy of Croatia, Washington, D.C., 2011

Upon the independence of Croatia, the U.S. recognised Croatia in its modern form on April 7, 1992. The U.S. Consulate General in Zagreb gained embassy status on August 25, 1992. The first U.S. ambassador to Croatia was Peter Galbraith who served in this position from 1993 to 1998. By 1996, the U.S. established Croatia as its strongest geopolitical connection to Southeast Europe.

The U.S. embassy in Croatia is located in Zagreb, southwest of Buzin. The 7,000 m^{2} compound began construction in 1999 and opened on June 2, 2003, with an opening ceremony held in its atrium on June 13. Designed for maximum safety following the 1998 U.S. embassy bombings in Africa, it consists of a five-floor main building surrounded by a park and a 3-meter-high wall. All service buildings are located near the outer wall. The building was designed by Hellmuth, Obata + Kassabaum architects Morgan R. Williams and Robert Barr, with input and aid from Croatian architect Ivan Franić.

The U.S. embassy in Zagreb is a charter member of the League of Green Embassies and a founding member of the Zagreb Green Building Council. According to this, embassy support recycling, energy and water use reduction programs. The embassy also sponsors American Corners at libraries in Osijek, Rijeka, Zadar, and Zagreb.

== History ==
=== Early relations ===
The Republic of Ragusa, a merchant republic centered at the Croatian city of Dubrovnik, was one of the first foreign countries to de facto recognize independence of the United States. Ragusa extended that de facto recognition through the efforts of Francesco Favi, the Ragusan consul in Paris, on July 7, 1783. The Republic never recognized the United States in a de jure sense. The first U.S. President to visit Croatia was Richard Nixon, who came to Zagreb on 2 October 1970 during his state visit to Yugoslavia. The choice to visit Zagreb during political and cultural developments in Socialist Republic of Croatia that would culminate in the Croatian Spring, along with Nixon's praise for the "spirit of Croatia" and his exclamation "Long live Croatia! Long live Yugoslavia!", has been interpreted as a statement of support for Croatian identity and greater autonomy within the federal framework of Yugoslavia.

=== Contemporary relations ===
==== Clinton administration (1993–2001) ====
The first U.S. president to visit independent Croatia was Bill Clinton on 13 January 1996. Clinton spent a few hours on the Zagreb Airport while returning from visiting IFOR troops in Tuzla, Bosnia and Herzegovina. During his visit, Clinton gave a speech in front of a crowd waving Croatian and American flags, then met with Croatian President Franjo Tuđman.

Croatian and U.S. intelligence agencies coordinated a joint response to the October 1995 Rijeka bombing, a suicide attack perpetrated by the Islamic terrorist organization al-Gama'a al-Islamiyya against Croatia. In September, the group's leader, Tal'at Fu'ad Qasim, was arrested in Croatia a month after the attack. He was interrogated by Croatian and U.S. authorities via extraordinary rendition and then executed by the Egyptian government.

==== George W. Bush administration (2001–2009) ====
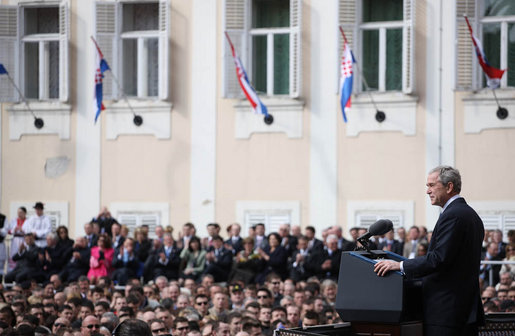
George W. Bush giving a speech on St. Mark's Square, 2008

On 4 April 2008, U.S. President George W. Bush arrived in Zagreb on an official 2-day state visit. The visit immediately followed the 2008 Bucharest summit of NATO countries where Croatia and Albania received invitations to join the alliance. Bush met with President of Croatia Stipe Mesić and Prime Minister Ivo Sanader, and gave a speech in St. Mark's Square in downtown Zagreb. Peaceful rallies were held during the visit to protest U.S. foreign policy and Croatian NATO membership. U.S. President George W. Bush approved the NATO membership of Croatia and Albania later that month.

==== Obama administration (2009–2017) ====
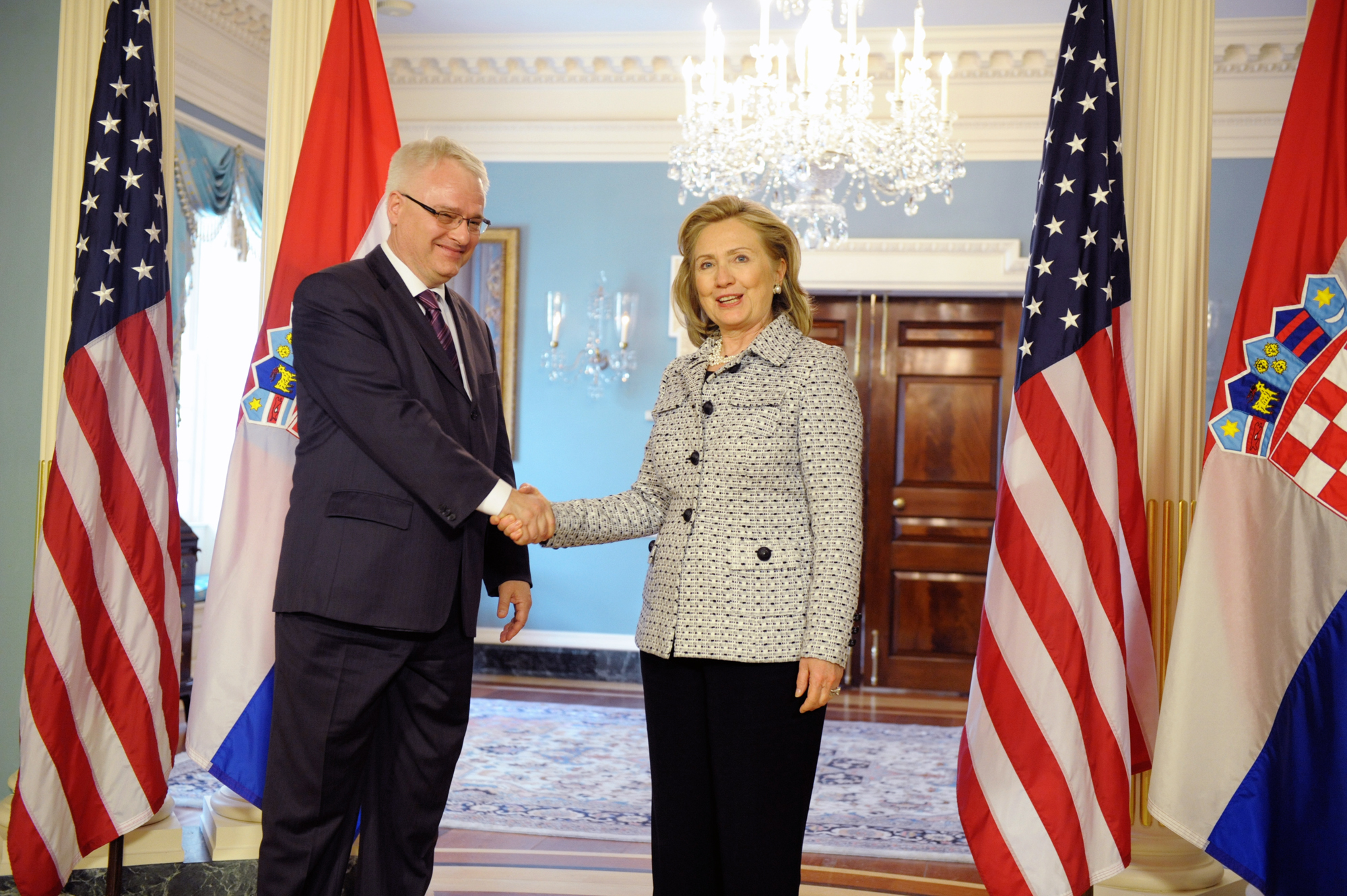
Ivo Josipović and Hillary Clinton, 2011

U.S. Secretary of State Hillary Clinton visited Croatia on October 30, 2012. During her visit she met with many Croatian officials including President Ivo Josipović, Prime Minister Zoran Milanović and Foreign Minister Vesna Pusić. Main topics of discussions were Croatian role in NATO and the Croatian accession to the European Union as well as economic relations between the U.S. and Croatia. Secretary Clinton called Croatia a "leader in Southeast Europe" that had well educated workforce, established infrastructure, geopolitical importance, adding that it was promising destination but that there was still a necessity for additional reforms, increase of transparency, elimination of bureaucratic barriers, as well as increased privatization state-owned companies.

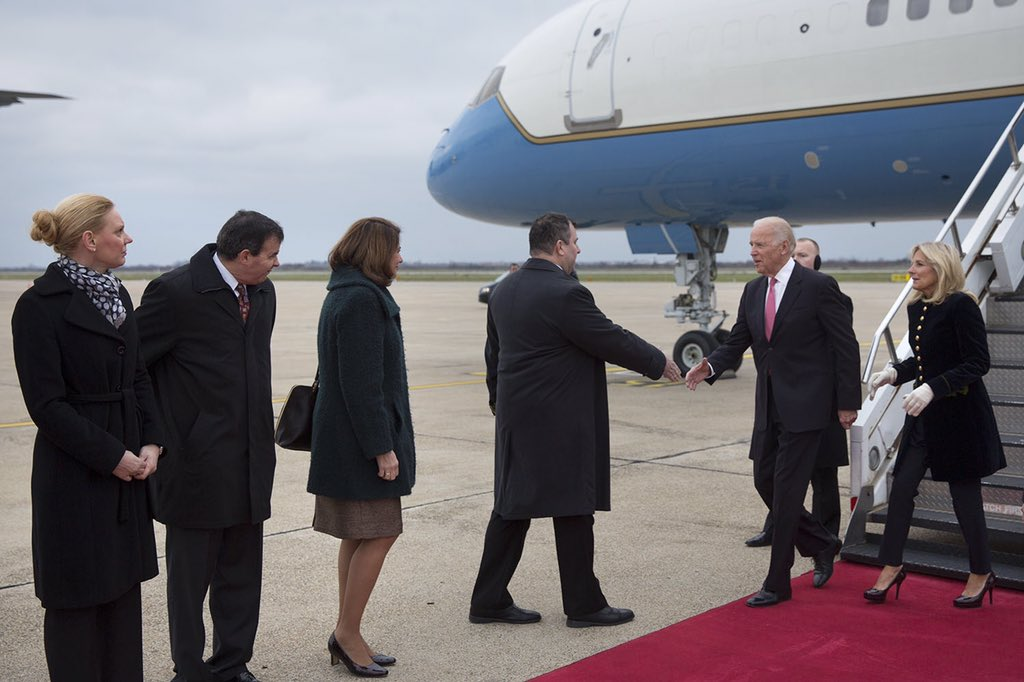
U.S. Vice President Joe Biden and Second Lady Jill Biden arrive in Croatia, 2015

On November 25, 2015, U.S. Vice President Joe Biden visited Croatia as a special guest of the Brdo-Brijuni Process Leaders' Summit. Discussed topics on the plenary session were integration of Southeast Europe into Euro-Atlantic processes, migrant crisis, security challenges and the fight against terrorism, conflicts in the Middle East and Ukraine, as well as energy. Vice President Biden met with the Croatian Prime Minister Zoran Milanović and Foreign Minister Vesna Pusić with whom he talked about situation in the Middle East, especially about the war in Syria, migrant crisis and the security situation in the world after 2015 Paris terrorist attacks.

==== First Trump administration (2017–2021) ====
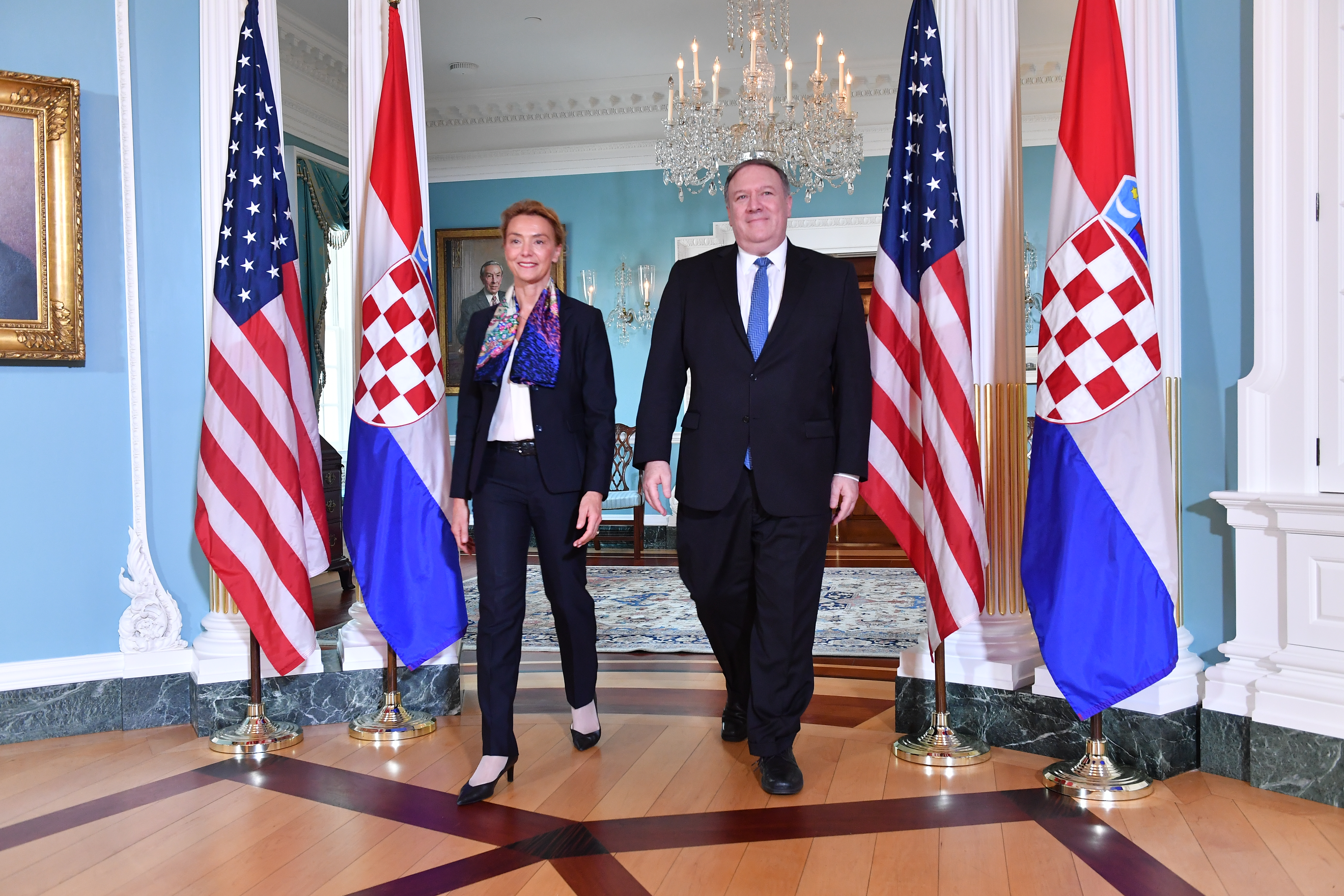
U.S. Secretary of State Mike Pompeo with Foreign Minister Marija Pejčinović-Burić, 2018

In 2018 and 2020 the U.S. Secretary of State, Mike Pompeo, visited Dubrovnik, where he had a meeting with Croatia's prime minister Andrej Plenković and other Croatian government officials. Following the 2020 meeting, the Croatian foreign minister, Gordan Grlić-Radman, said that Croatia had signed no document whereby it would undertake to refrain from co-operating with China on the issues of 5G security. Pompeo's visit was foreshadowed by statements made by Croatia's president Zoran Milanović, who harshly criticized U.S. foreign policy, particularly its disengagement with various international organizations.

==== Biden administration (2021–2025) ====
During the presidency of Joe Biden, the U.S. government significantly expanded their foreign affairs mandate with Croatia. U.S. advocated for Croatia to accelerate its transition to a market-based economy and further project allied military strength in the region. The U.S. offered support to strengthen "judicial efficiency, anti-corruption, and law enforcement capacity" in Croatia. Relations in 2022 were buoyed by easing of visa requirements and Croatia's inclusion in the U.S.-led Global Entry Program.

==== Second Trump administration (2025–present) ====
Amid U.S. disengagement with the international community, Croatia was relatively insulated from adverse U.S. foreign policy in the region. Croatian Prime Minister Andrej Plenković visited the U.S. in May 2025, to meet with the U.S. Congressional Croatian-American Friendship Caucus, highlighting key bilateral military and energy projects. The U.S. and Croatia are interested in executing a double taxation waiver treaty. Croatia's entry into the OECD was briefly blocked by President Donald Trump amid a broader 2025 trade war with Europe, but resumed later on with entry expected by late-2026.

== Military cooperation ==
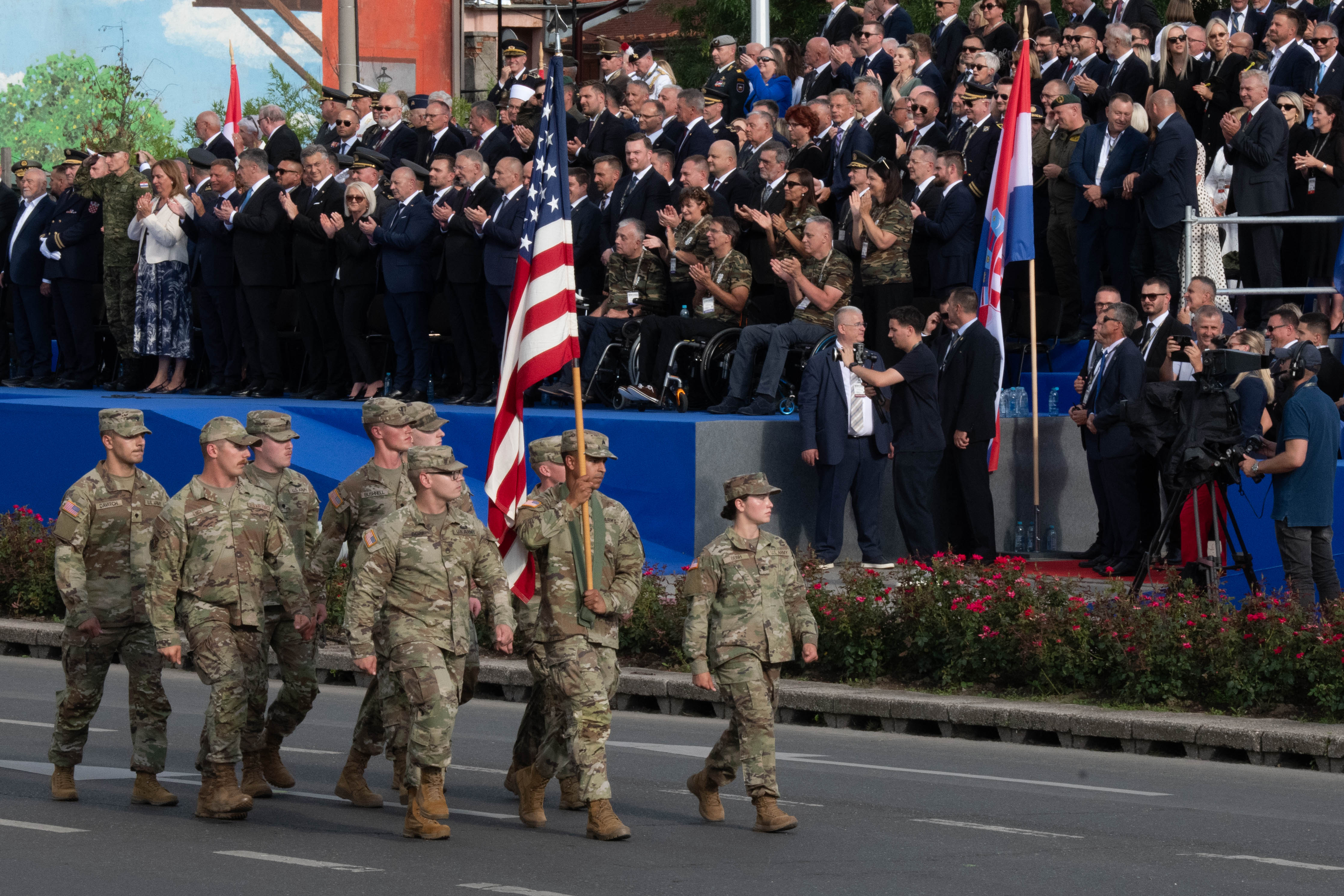
The U.S. Army carrying the American flag through Croatia during a military parade, 2025

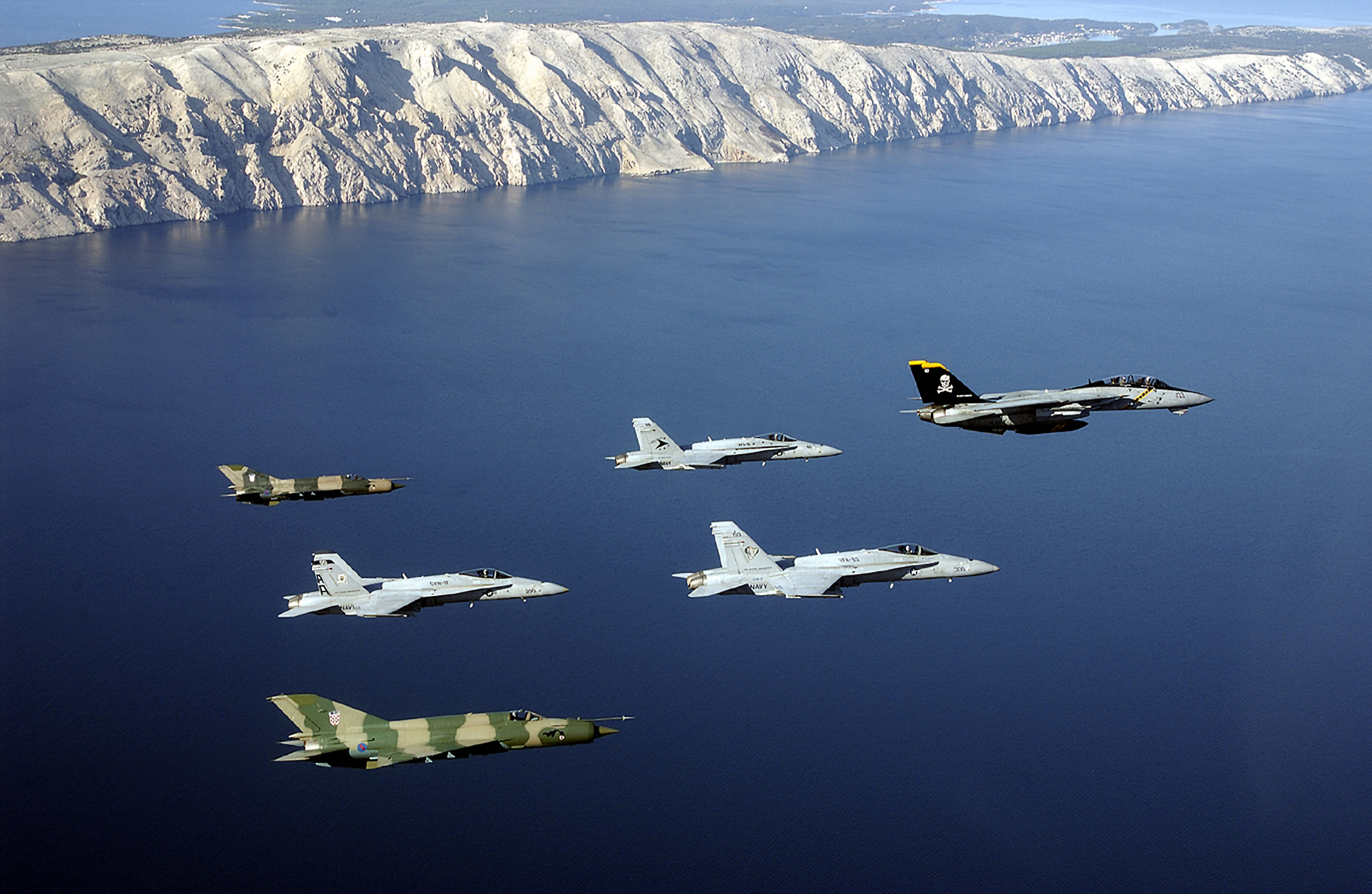
Croatian Air Force flanking the U.S. Navy over Pula, 2009

Croatia and the United States are close military allies and share a strong bilateral defense industrial base. The U.S. government has stated that its Department of Defense had a "robust military-to-military relationship with Croatia" with the U.S. providing military assistance to Croatia in the form of training, equipment, equipment loans, and education in U.S. military schools. Both are members of NATO, leveraging Croatia's aerospace and defense manufacturing and U.S. military operations to advance multilateral initiatives. In 1995, the U.S. trained and equipped the Croatian Armed Forces in joint-initiation of Operation Storm during the Croatian War of Independence, securing much of modern Croatian borders. Since Operation Sharp Guard in 1993, the territorial waters of Croatia have been a deterrence asset in Southern Europe for the U.S. and NATO. The U.S. and Croatia jointly celebrated the 20th and 30th anniversary of Operation Storm in Zagreb – in 2015 and 2025, respectively – with a large-scale military parade. After the 2022 Tu-141 drone crash in Zagreb, the U.S. dispatched two F-16 fighter jets in a show of military strength for Croatia.

The United States Navy frequently docks naval ships and aircraft carriers in Split, where it maintains a logistical office in the Lora Naval Base. The United States European Command maintains a training facility at this naval base. The Croatian island of Krk has served as a logistics hub for U.S. military supply chains heading to the Middle East. The two nations have deep defence integration and interoperability. The Croatian Armed Forces have a special relationship with the U.S.-based Minnesota National Guard through their State Partnership Program.

=== Military aid ===
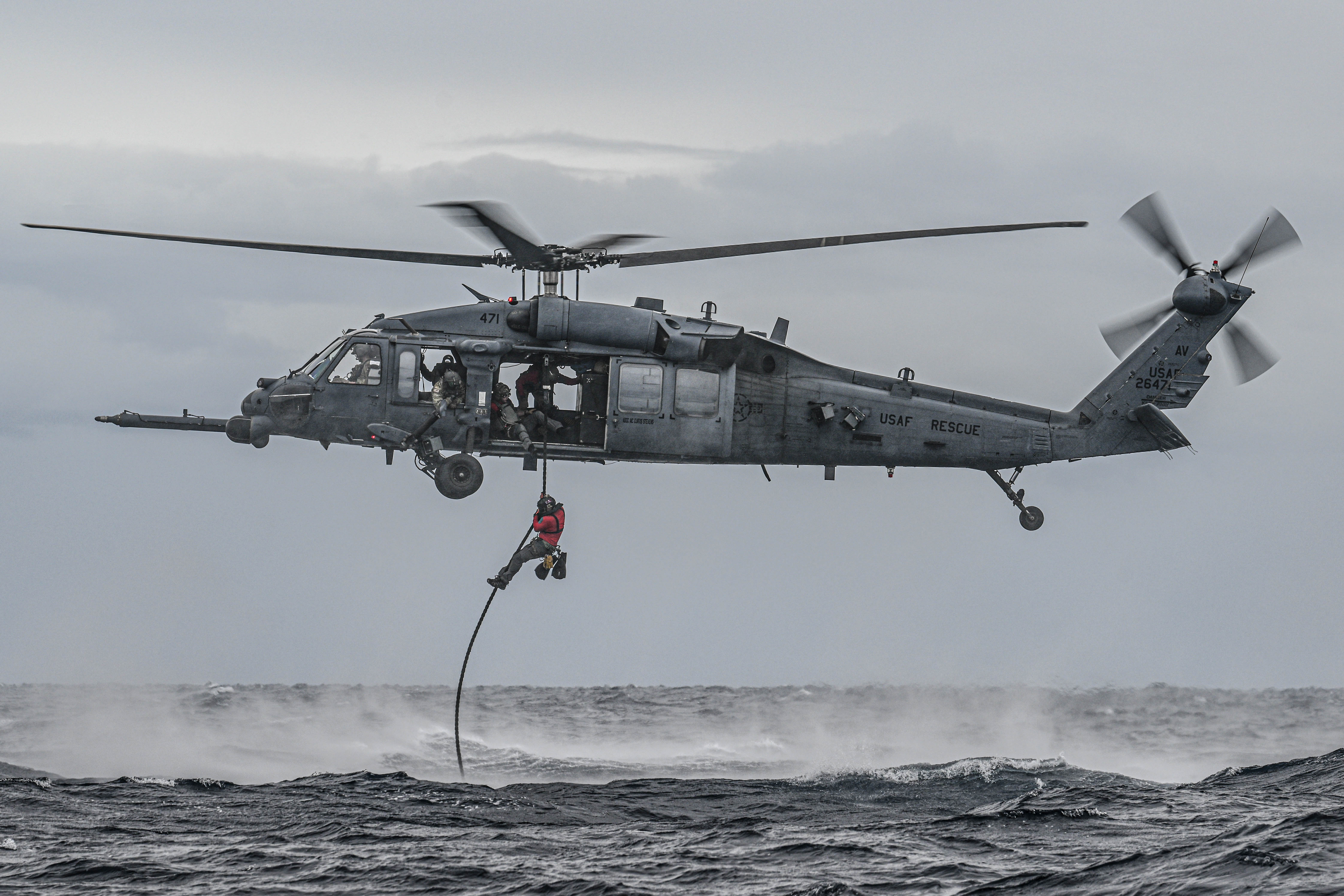
U.S. and Croatian military personnel fast rope into the Adriatic Sea as part of search-and-rescue drills, 2009

The U.S. and Croatia have worked together on over 11 military programs, funds and initiatives since the 1990s. Croatia received $18.5 million in military financing in 2000, with another $14.5 million in 2008 to purchasing covert surveillance programs. Between 2010 and 2014, the U.S. sent Croatia $31 million to buy HMMWV vehicles for training, communication and navigation equipment. In April 2014, Croatia took delivery of 30 U.S. MRAP vehicles out of the 212 MRAP vehicles that the U.S. government had decided on donating to Croatia. A year later, another $11 million was received for special forces training. Through coalition support funding for their mutual ISAF mission in Afghanistan, the U.S. partially refunded Croatia $16.9 million from 2011 to 2013 to improve maritime radar systems. The U.S. security assistance program, IMET, implemented over 600 training programs in Croatia at an estimated cost of $9 million.

== Economic cooperation ==
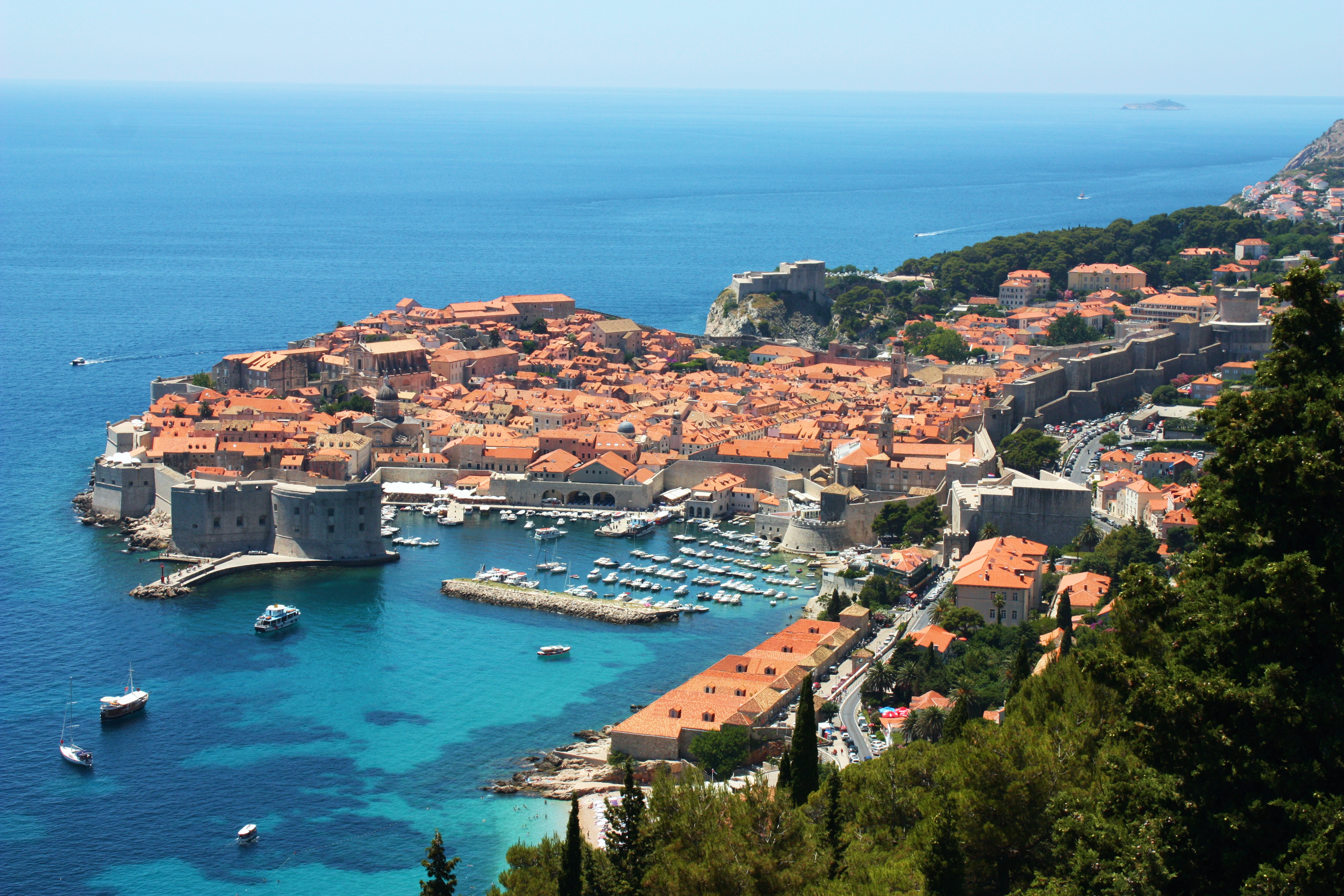
U.S. travel to Croatia supports its economy and tourism sector. Pictured: Dubrovnik, 2011

Economic relations between Croatia and the United States are robust. An investment treaty between the two countries was first signed in 1996, increasing protection of U.S. business interests in Croatia. In 2013 Croatia exported $327,992 worth of goods to the U.S. and imported from it $221,794 worth of goods. The U.S. is the most important trade partner in North America for Croatia ahead of the Cayman Islands and Canada. The U.S. is the 8th-most important trading partner for Croatia in the world.

Travel and tourism between the two countries represent material economic cooperation. In 2013, around 220,043 Americans, who have made 548,727 overnight stays, came to Croatia on a holiday. The U.S. donated more than $27 million in humanitarian assistance to Croatia from 1998 to 2016. The U.S. provided additional financial assistance to Croatia through the Southeastern European Economic Development Program (SEED) to facilitate democratization and restructuring of Croatia's financial sector, largely through programs managed by USAID.

== Croatian diaspora ==
The modern Croatian diaspora in the U.S. is the largest in the world with an estimate of more than 1.2 million members in 2016. Most of the Croats live in Chicago (~150,000), New York City, New Jersey and Connecticut (~80,000), St. Louis (~40,000), San Pedro (~35,000), Detroit (~7,000) and San Jose (~5,000). The National Federation of Croatian Americans is the main organization that brings together Croats in the U.S. According to the 1990 United States census, there were over 544,270 Croatian Americans, a figure which had fallen to 414,714 by 2012.

== See also ==
- Foreign relations of Croatia
- Foreign relations of the United States
- United States-EU relations
- NATO-EU relations
