= Žužul =

Žužul is a Croatian surname. Notable people with the surname include:

- Miomir Žužul (born 1955), Croatian diplomat and politician
- Šime Žužul (born 1996), Croatian footballer
