= Mate Meštrović =

Croatian-American journalist, lobbyist and politician (1930–2025)

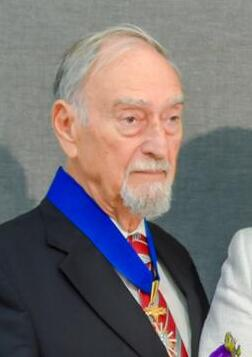
- Meštrović in 2019

Croatia Ambassador to Bulgaria
- In office 1997–2000
- Preceded by: Neven Jurica
- Succeeded by: Tonči Staničić

Personal details
- Born: 13 September 1930 Zagreb, Kingdom of Yugoslavia (modern Croatia)
- Died: 30 December 2025 (aged 95) Zagreb, Croatia
- Relations: Tvrtko Mestrovic (brother); Stjepan Meštrović (nephew)
- Parent: Ivan Meštrović (father)
- Occupation: Journalist; academic; lobbyist; politician; ambassador
- Awards: Order of Merit of the Republic of Poland, Commander's Cross, 2019

Military service
- Allegiance: United States
- Branch/service: United States Army
- Years of service: 1954–1956
- Rank: Lieutenant
- Battles/wars: Korean War

Academic background
- Education: Syracuse University; Columbia University

Academic work
- Discipline: Historian
- Institutions: Fairleigh Dickinson University

Mate Meštrović (13 September 1930 – 30 December 2025), also known as Matthew Mestrovic (or Matthew Meštrović), was a Croatian-American journalist, lobbyist, politician and diplomat.

== Life and career ==
Meštrović was born on 13 September 1930. The son of Croatian sculptor Ivan Meštrović, he attended grade school in Zagreb before his family moved to Italy in 1942. The family lived in Switzerland from 1943 to 1946 where he finished 'Ecole Internationale de Genève'. The family moved to the United States of America the following year where his father continued his work as an artist and where Mate would spend most of his life.

He graduated from university in 1951 and the following year received a master's degree in history at the Syracuse University. From 1954 to 1956, he served as a lieutenant in the US Army PsyWar in the Pacific and is also a Korean War veteran. He earned a PhD from Columbia University in 1957. He worked as a Contributing Editor of TIME and wrote many articles for American and European newspapers and magazines, including Commonweal, The New Leader, "The Intelligence Report" of The Economist, etc. He taught as Modern European history at Fairleigh Dickinson University and other United States universities from 1967 to 1991. In 1986, he was awarded the Ellis Island Medal of Honor.

Meštrović was active in the Croatian independence movement in Communist Yugoslavia. Meštrović led the Croatian National Congress. He visited Communist Yugoslavia for the first time in 1969. During this visit he made contacts with members of Hrvatski književni list and Matica hrvatska. From 1982 to 1990 he served as president of the Croatian National Council, an umbrella group of Croatian emigrant organizations which lobbied for Croatian independence.

He wrote several books in English and Croatian, notably What you should know about Communism and why, The struggle for Croatia and In the whirlpool of Croatian Politics. In the U.S., he published Franjo Tudjman's book, Nationalism in Contemporary Europe, and Venko Markovski's Goli Otok – The Island of Death. He also authored several political tracts, notably Violations of Human and National Rights of the Croatian People in Yugoslavia and Croatian Response to the Memorandum of the Serbian Academy of Science and Art.

Meštrović returned to Croatia in the early 1990s. He served as a deputy in the Croatian Parliament (1993–97), member of Croatia's delegation to the Council of Europe and the Inter-Parliamentary Union and ambassador in Bulgaria (1997–2000). Meštrović died on 30 December 2025, at the age of 95.

== Honours ==
- Commander's Cross of the Order of Merit of the Republic of Poland (2019)

== Notes ==
Diplomatic posts
Preceded by Neven Jurica	Ambassador of Croatia to Bulgaria; 1997–1999	Succeeded by Tonči Staničić
