= Kolinda Grabar-Kitarović =

President of Croatia from 2015 to 2020

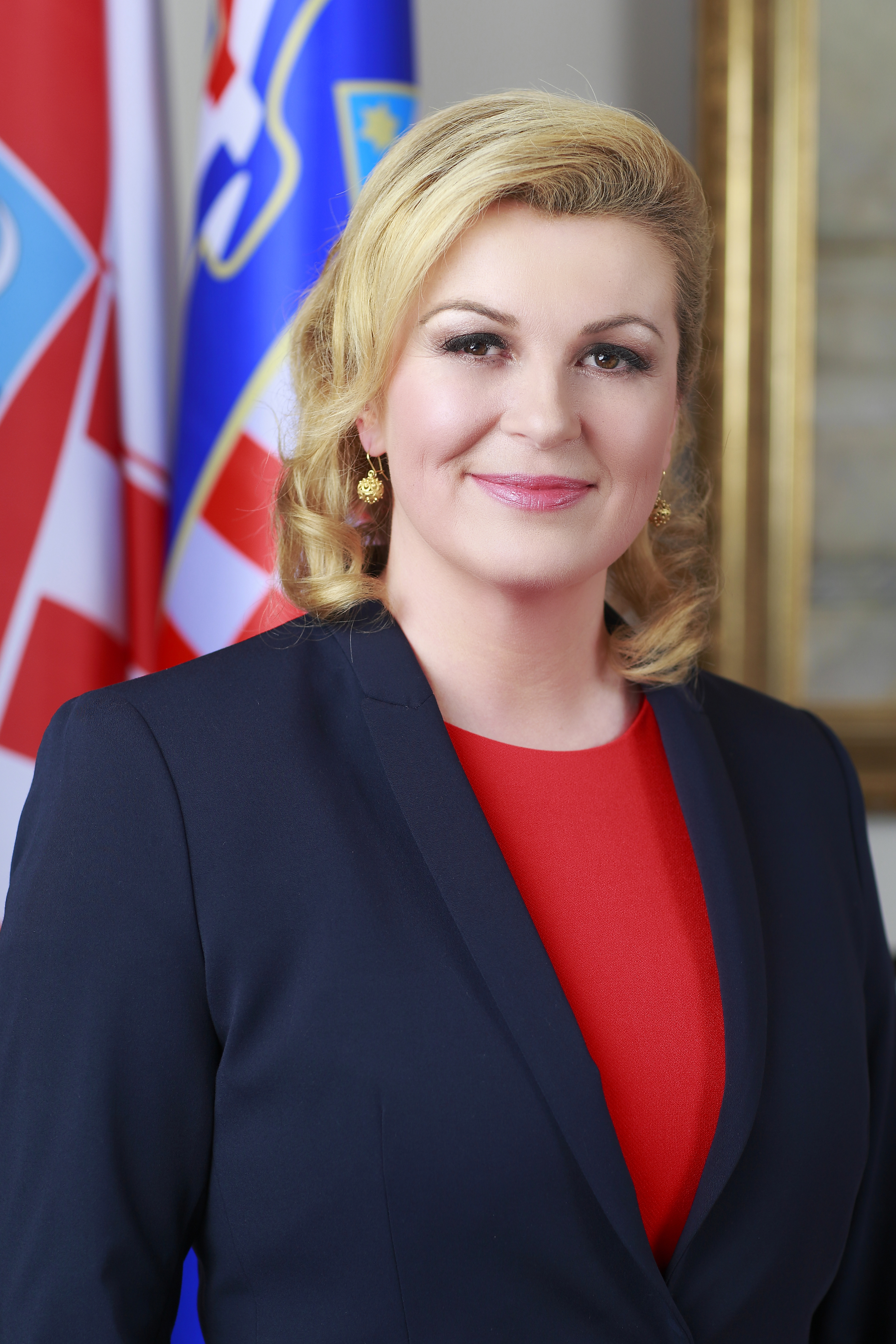
- Official portrait, 2015

President of Croatia
- In office 19 February 2015 – 18 February 2020
- Prime Minister: Zoran Milanović; Tihomir Orešković; Andrej Plenković
- Preceded by: Ivo Josipović
- Succeeded by: Zoran Milanović

Assistant Secretary General of NATO for Public Diplomacy
- In office 4 July 2011 – 2 October 2014
- Secretary General: Anders Fogh Rasmussen; Jens Stoltenberg
- Preceded by: Stefanie Babst (acting)
- Succeeded by: Ted Whiteside (acting)

Ambassador of Croatia to the United States
- In office 8 March 2008 – 4 July 2011
- President: Stjepan Mesić; Ivo Josipović
- Preceded by: Neven Jurica
- Succeeded by: Vice Skračić (acting)

Minister of Foreign and European Affairs
- In office 17 February 2005 – 12 January 2008
- Prime Minister: Ivo Sanader
- Preceded by: Miomir Žužul (Foreign Affairs); Herself (European Affairs)
- Succeeded by: Gordan Jandroković

Minister of European Affairs
- In office 23 December 2003 – 16 February 2005
- Prime Minister: Ivo Sanader
- Preceded by: Neven Mimica
- Succeeded by: Position abolished

Member of the Croatian Parliament
- In office 22 December 2003 – 11 January 2008
- Succeeded by: Božica Šolić

Member of the International Olympic Committee
- Incumbent
- Assumed office 17 July 2020

Co-Chair of the Global Preparedness Monitoring Board
- Incumbent
- Assumed office 26 June 2023
- Preceded by: Joy Phumaphi

Personal details
- Born: Kolinda Grabar; 29 April 1968 (age 58) Rijeka, SR Croatia, SFR Yugoslavia (modern Croatia)
- Party: Croatian Democratic Union (1993–2015); Independent (2015–present)
- Spouse: Jakov Kitarović (m. 1996)
- Children: 2
- Education: University of Zagreb; Diplomatic Academy of Vienna; George Washington University
- Website: Government website

Kolinda Grabar-Kitarović (pronounced [ɡrǎbar kitǎːroʋitɕ]; née Grabar; born 29 April 1968) is a Croatian politician and diplomat who served as the president of Croatia from 2015 to 2020. She was the first woman to be elected to the office since the first multi-party elections in 1990 and independence from Yugoslavia in 1991. At 46 years of age, she was the youngest person to assume the presidency.

Before her election as President of Croatia, Grabar-Kitarović held a number of governmental and diplomatic posts. She was minister of European Affairs from 2003 to 2005, the first female minister of Foreign Affairs and European Integration from 2005 to 2008, Croatian ambassador to the United States from 2008 to 2011 and assistant secretary general for public diplomacy at NATO under Secretaries General Anders Fogh Rasmussen and Jens Stoltenberg from 2011 to 2014. She is a recipient of the Fulbright Lifetime Achievement Award and a number of national and international awards, decorations, honorary doctorates and honorary citizenships.

Grabar-Kitarović was a member of the conservative Croatian Democratic Union party from 1993 to 2015 and was also one of three Croatian members of the Trilateral Commission, but she was required to resign both positions upon taking office as president in 2015, as Croatian presidents are not permitted to hold other political positions or party membership while in office. As president, she launched the Three Seas Initiative in 2015, together with Polish President Andrzej Duda. In 2017, Forbes magazine listed her as the world's 39th most powerful woman. In 2020, Grabar-Kitarović was elected a member of the International Olympic Committee.

== Early life and education ==
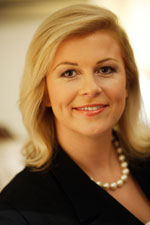
Grabar-Kitarović in 2006

Kolinda Grabar was born on 29 April 1968 in Rijeka, Croatia, then part of Yugoslavia, to Dubravka and Branko Grabar. She was raised mainly in her parents' village of Lopača, just north of Rijeka, where the family owned a butcher shop and a ranch. As a high school student, she entered a student exchange program and at 17 moved to Los Alamos, New Mexico, subsequently graduating from Los Alamos High School in 1986.

Upon her return to Yugoslavia, she enrolled at the Faculty of Humanities and Social Sciences, University of Zagreb, graduating in 1993 with a Bachelor of Arts in English and Spanish languages and literature. From 1995 to 1996, she attended the Diploma Course at the Diplomatic Academy of Vienna. In 2000 she obtained a master's degree in international relations from the Faculty of Political Science at the University of Zagreb.

In 2002–2003, she attended George Washington University's Elliott School of International Affairs as a Fulbright scholar. She also received a Luksic Fellowship at the Harvard Kennedy School at Harvard University and was a visiting scholar at the School of Advanced International Studies at Johns Hopkins University.

In December 2015, Grabar-Kitarović began her doctoral studies in international relations at the Zagreb Faculty of Political Science.

== Career ==
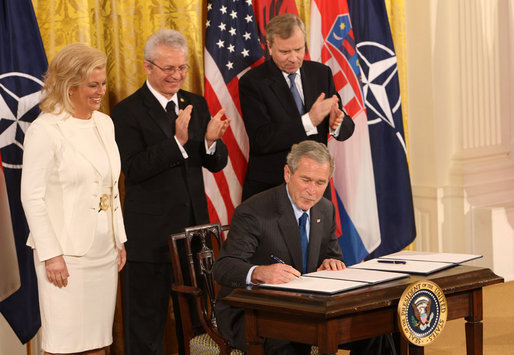
From left to right: Grabar-Kitarović, Sallabanda and De Hoop Scheffer with President George W. Bush, signing protocols in support of Albanian and Croatian accession to NATO, 2008

In 1992, Grabar-Kitarović became an advisor to the international cooperation department of the Ministry of Science and Technology. In 1993 she joined the Croatian Democratic Union (HDZ). In the same year she transferred to the Foreign ministry, becoming an advisor. She became the head of the North American department of the Foreign ministry in 1995 and held that post until 1997. That year she began to work at the Croatian embassy in Canada as a diplomatic councilor until October 1998, and then as a minister-councilor.

When Social Democratic Party of Croatia (SDP) came to power after 2000 elections Tonino Picula became minister of Foreign Affairs. After taking office he immediately started to remove politically appointed staff that had been appointed by the Croatian Democratic Union (HDZ) to high-ranking diplomatic positions. Grabar-Kitarović was ordered to return to Croatia from Canada within next six weeks, which she at first refused to do because she was pregnant and had already made plans to give birth in Canada, however she eventually decided to return after being strongly pressured by the ministry to do so. During her stay in the hospital, she applied for Fulbright scholarship for studying international relations and security policy. She eventually moved to the United States and enrolled at George Washington University. After graduating, she returned to Croatia and continued to live in Rijeka.

Two years later, she was elected to the Croatian Parliament from the seventh electoral district as a member of the Croatian Democratic Union in the 2003 parliamentary elections. With the formation of the new government led by HDZ chairman Ivo Sanader she became Minister of European integration, which entailed the commencement of negotiations regarding Croatia's accession to the European Union.

After the separate ministries of Foreign Affairs and European Integration were merged in 2005 Grabar-Kitarović was nominated to become minister of Foreign Affairs and European Integration. She was confirmed by the Parliament and sworn in on 17 February 2005. Her main task as foreign minister was to guide Croatia into the European Union and NATO. On 18 January 2005, she became head of the State Delegation for Negotiations on the Croatian accession to the European Union. Furthermore, on 28 November 2005 she was elected by the international community to preside over the Anti-Personnel Mine Ban Convention's Sixth Meeting of the States Parties, or Ottawa Treaty, held that year in Zagreb. Grabar-Kitarović was the first woman to be named president of the Ottawa Treaty.

Following the HDZ's victory in the 2007 parliamentary election and the subsequent formation of the Second Sanader Cabinet, she was reappointed as foreign minister, but was suddenly removed from the position on 12 January 2008. The exact reason for her removal is not known. Gordan Jandroković succeeded her.

On March 8, 2008, while the President of Croatia was Stjepan Mesić, she became the Croatian ambassador to the United States, where she replaced Neven Jurica. She served as ambassador until 4 July 2011.

On October 24, 2008, Grabar-Kitarović joined President George W. Bush and NATO Secretary General Jaap De Hoop Scheffer during the signing of NATO accession protocols in the East Room of the White House, in support of the nations of Albania and Croatia joining the NATO alliance.

On May 6, 2010, the Croatian Embassy held a reception to celebrate women diplomats at the Croatian Embassy, which was attended by ambassadors to the U.S. from Croatia, India, Liechtenstein, Trinidad and Tobago, Grenada, Senegal, and Antigua and Barbuda. The event was opened by Grabar-Kitarović by discussing the importance of taking small steps when it comes to mentoring.

In 2010, the Croatian Embassy in Washington, DC discovered that Grabar-Kitarović's husband, Jakov, had been continually filmed while using an official embassy car. A member of the embassy's security staff had followed and filmed Kitarović, recording footage that was posted on YouTube. As a result, Foreign Minister Gordan Jandroković launched an internal investigation into the unauthorized filming of members of the diplomatic staff and their families by a member of the embassy's security staff. A member of the embassy's security staff who had filmed her family was fired.

In 2011, Grabar-Kitarović was appointed Assistant Secretary General for Public Diplomacy at NATO, the first woman to hold the position. Her task was to take care of the "communication strategy" and to "bring NATO closer to the common people". Her colleagues at NATO often referred to her as SWAMBO (She Who Must Be Obeyed). She served until 2 October 2014.

She was invited to join the Trilateral Commission and became an official member in April 2013.

=== Support for 2014–2016 Croatian war veterans tent protest ===
During her presidential candidacy, Kolinda Grabar-Kitarović supported protesting war veterans, despite the fact that the group of protesters near the central tent blocked the traffic and brought bottles of gasoline on Savska street which they apparently threatened to ignite if the police refused to back off. This support for war veterans, regardless threats of violence, was considered an unacceptable populist posture in order to gain the support of more of the right-leaning electorate in the upcoming presidential election.

== 2014–15 presidential candidacy ==
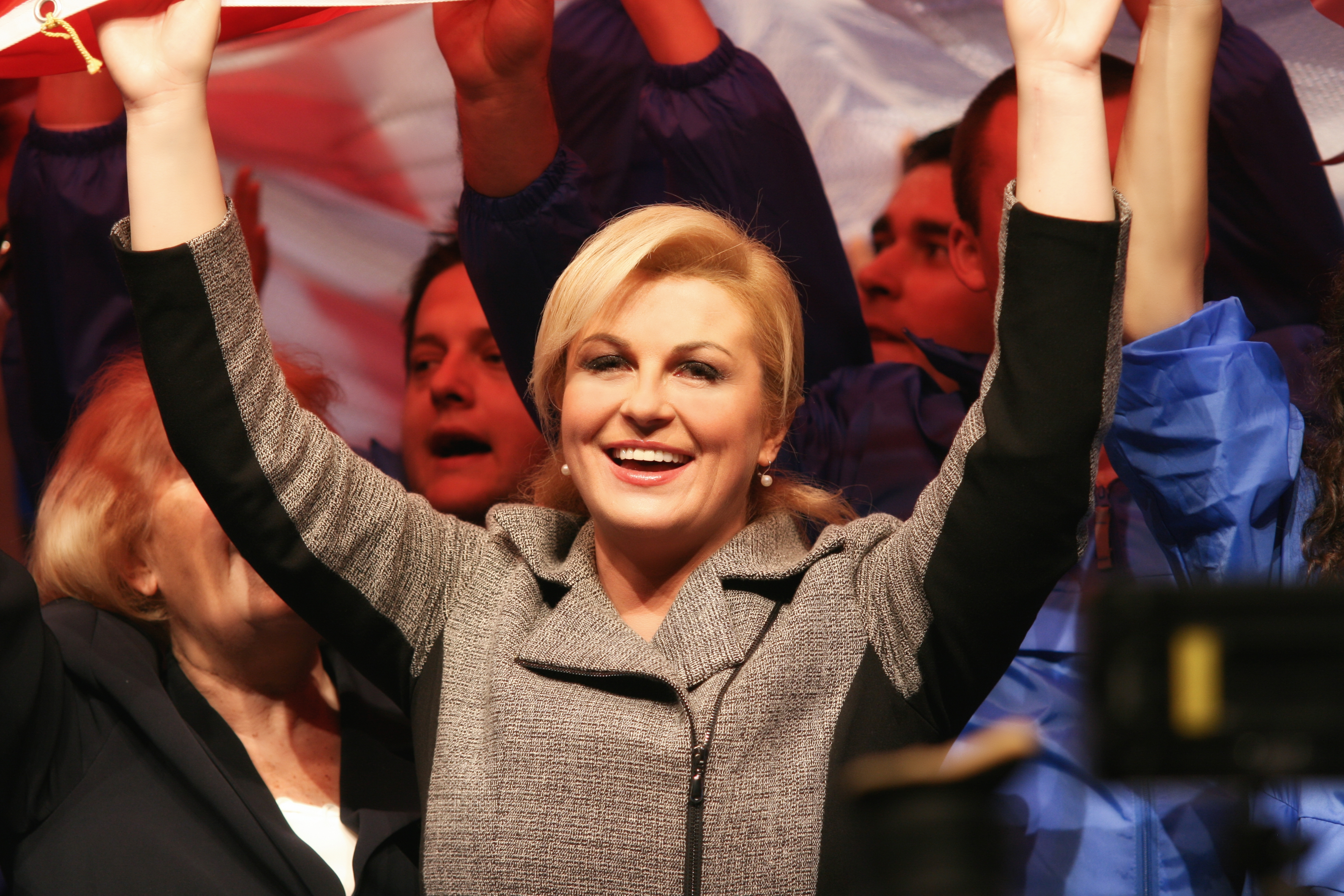
Grabar-Kitarović during the 2014–15 presidential election campaign

Croatian daily newspaper Jutarnji List published an article in September 2012 stating that Grabar-Kitarović was being considered as a possible candidate for the 2014–15 Croatian presidential election by the Croatian Democratic Union (HDZ). It was confirmed in mid-2014 that she was to become the party's official candidate, going up against incumbent Ivo Josipović and newcomers Ivan Vilibor Sinčić and Milan Kujundžić. In the first round of election in December 2014 Grabar-Kitarović won 37.2% of the vote, second to Josipović who received 38.5%, while Sinčić and Kujundžić won 16.4% and 6.3% of the vote respectively. Since no candidate received more than 50% of the vote, a run-off election was scheduled between the top two candidates, Josipović and Grabar-Kitarović, in two weeks time.

Grabar-Kitarović contested the presidential election held in December 2014 and January 2015 as the only female candidate (out of four in total), finishing as the runner-up in the first round and thereafter proceeding to narrowly defeat incumbent president Ivo Josipović in the second round (by a margin of 1.48%). Furthermore, as the country had previously also had a female prime minister, Jadranka Kosor, from 2009 until 2011, Grabar-Kitarović's election as president led to Croatia's inclusion in a small group of parliamentary republics which have had both a female head of state and head of government.

The run-off took place on 11 January 2015, with Grabar-Kitarović winning 50.7% of the vote. She thereby became Croatia's first female post-independence head of state and the country's first conservative president in 15 years. (Note: Ema Derossi-Bjelajac served as President of the Presidency of the Socialist Republic of Croatia, a constituent republic of the Socialist Federative Republic of Yugoslavia and thus held a position equivalent to a head of state) She was ceremonially sworn into office on 15 February, and assumed office officially at midnight on 19 February 2015.

Upon election, Grabar-Kitarović became the first woman in Europe to defeat an incumbent president running for reelection, as well as the second woman in the world to do so, after Violeta Chamorro of Nicaragua in 1990. She is also the first candidate of any gender to defeat an incumbent Croatian president. In addition, Grabar-Kitarović is the only presidential candidate to date to have won a Croatian presidential election without having won the most votes in the first round of elections, as she lost it by 1.24% or 21,000 votes. Furthermore, the 1.114 million votes she received in the second round is the lowest number of votes for any winning candidate in a presidential election in Croatia and the 1.48% victory margin against Josipović is the smallest in any such election to date.

== Presidency (2015–2020) ==
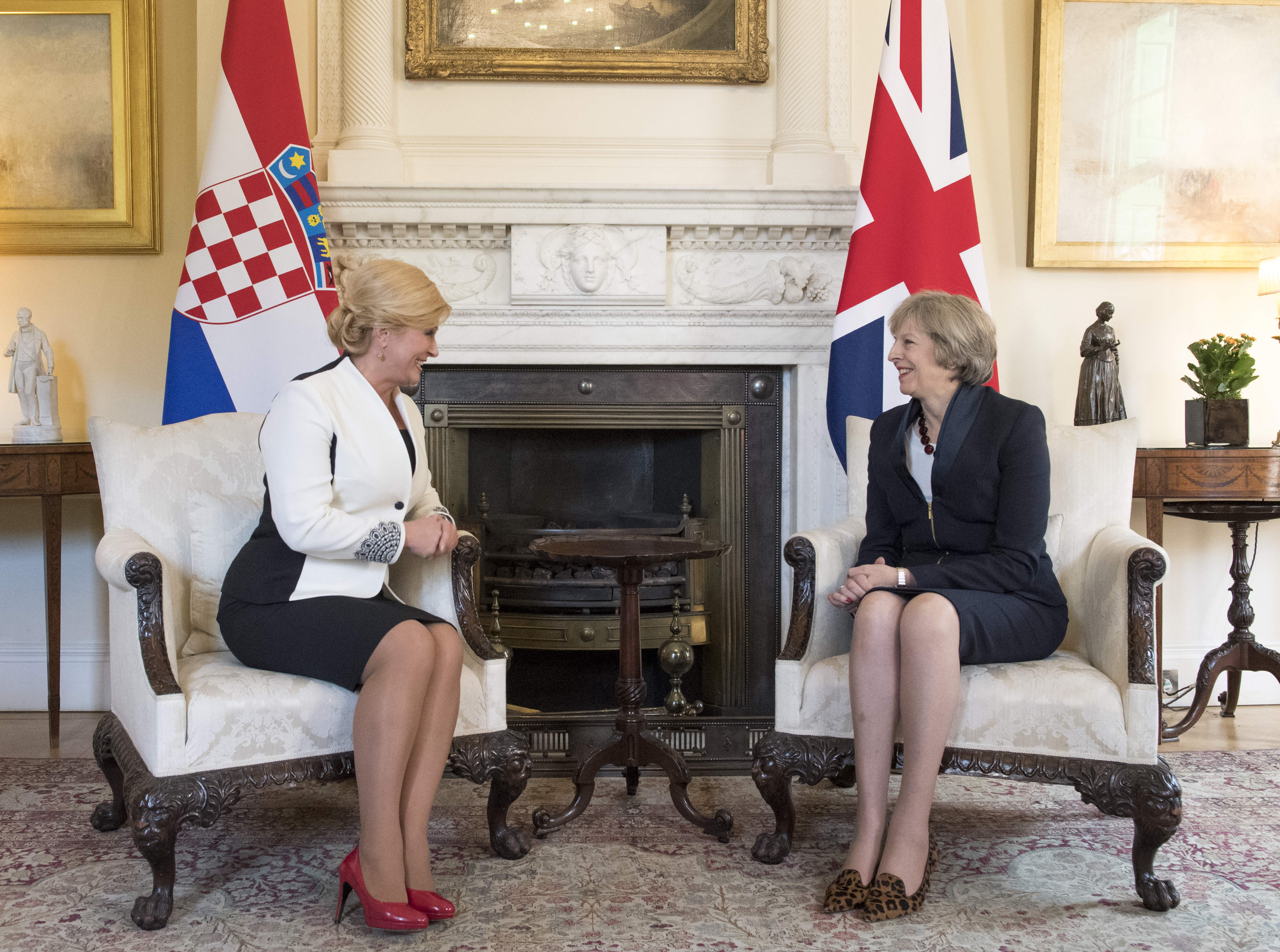
Grabar-Kitarović and British Prime Minister Theresa May at 10 Downing Street, 11 October 2016

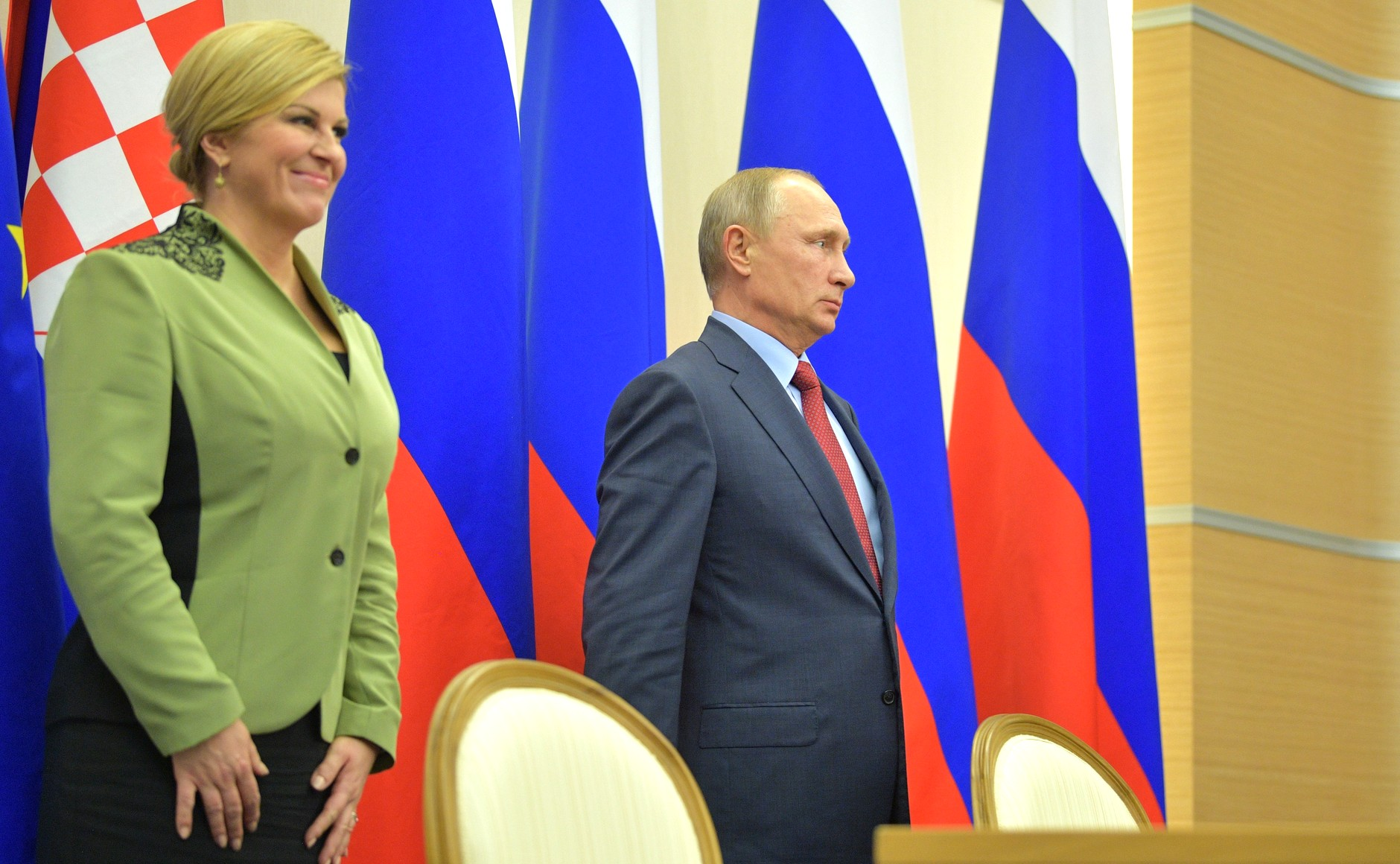
Grabar-Kitarović with Russian President Vladimir Putin, 18 October 2017

Less than nine months into Grabar-Kitarović's term the European migrant crisis began to escalate with large numbers of migrants entering Greece and Macedonia and crossing from Serbia into Hungary, with the latter beginning the construction of a fence on its southern border as a result. In September 2015, after Hungary constructed a fence and closed its border with Serbia, the flow of migrants was redirected towards Croatia, causing over 21,000 migrants to enter the country by 19 September, with the number rising to 39,000 immigrants, while 32,000 migrants exited Croatia, leaving through Slovenia and Hungary. She appointed Andrija Hebrang her commissioner for the refugee crisis.

With the parliament expected to dissolve by 25 September, Grabar-Kitarović called parliamentary elections for 8 November 2015. They proved inconclusive and negotiations on forming a government lasted for 76 days. Grabar-Kitarović had previously announced on 22 December 2015 that if there was no agreement on a possible Prime Minister-designate in the next 24 hours, she would call for an early election and name a non-partisan transitional government (which would have reportedly been headed by Damir Vanđelić), thereby putting intense pressure on the political parties involved in the negotiations regarding the formation of the new government, to find a solution. The crisis finally ended on 23 December 2015 when Grabar-Kitarović gave the 30-day mandate to form a government to the non-partisan Croatian-Canadian businessman Tihomir Orešković, who had been selected by HDZ and MOST only hours before the expiration of the President's delegated time frame for the naming of a Prime-Minister-designate.

On 24 August 2015, Grabar-Kitarović was, as Armed Forces Commander-in-Chief, presented with a petition for the introduction of a salute Za dom spremni to the official use in the Croatian Armed Forces. She immediately rejected the petition, calling it "frivolous, unacceptable and provocative". She called the salute a "Croatian historical greeting" that was "compromised and unacceptable". Following a backlash from some historians that the salute was not historical, Grabar-Kitarović admitted that she was wrong in that part of the statement.

On 29 September 2015, at the initiative of Grabar-Kitarović the Atlantic Council co-hosted an informal high-level Adriatic-Baltic-Black Sea Leaders' Meeting in New York City which would later grow to Three Seas Initiative. The Initiative was officially formed in 2016 and held its first summit in Dubrovnik, Croatia, on 25–26 August 2016.

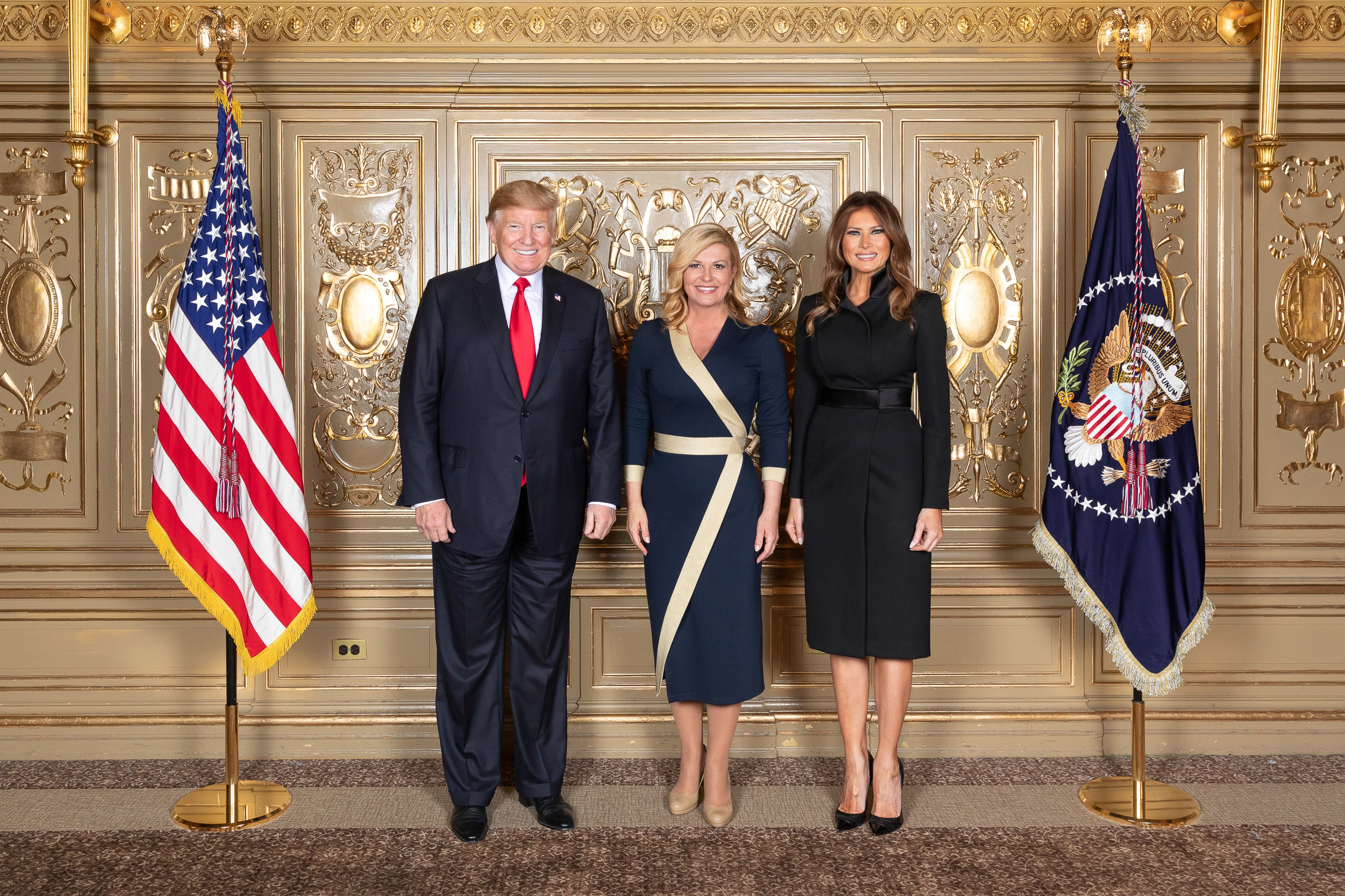
Grabar-Kitarović alongside U.S. President Donald Trump and First Lady Melania Trump, 26 September 2018

On 11 April 2016, after meeting with Nicolas Dean, the special envoy for Holocaust of the United States Department of State, Grabar-Kitarović stated that the "Independent State of Croatia (NDH) was least independent and was least protecting the interests of the Croatian people". Adding that the "Ustaše regime was criminal regime", that "anti-fascism is in the foundation of the Croatian Constitution" and that the "modern Croatian state has grown on the foundations of the Croatian War of Independence." In May 2016, Grabar-Kitarović visited Tehran on the invitation of Iranian President Hassan Rouhani. Rouhani called on Croatia to be the gateway to Iran's ties with Europe. The two presidents reaffirmed the traditionally good relations between their countries and signed an agreement on economic cooperation.

Grabar-Kitarović expressed her condolences to Slobodan Praljak's family after he committed suicide in The Hague where he was facing trial, calling him "a man who preferred to give his life, rather than to live, having been convicted of crimes he firmly believed he had not committed", adding that "his act struck deeply at the heart of the Croatian people and left the International Criminal Tribunal for the Former Yugoslavia with the weight of eternal doubt about the accomplishment of its tasks".

In a speech held at the ceremony at which Grabar-Kitarović was named honorary citizen of Buenos Aires in March 2018, she stated that "after World War II, many Croats found a space of freedom in Argentina where they could testify to their patriotism and express their justified demands for the freedom of the Croatian people and homeland." Following the end of the war and the establishment of a communist regime, about 20,000 Croats, mostly political emigrants, moved to Argentina. As some among them were members of the Ustaše movement, her statement was interpreted by some, including Efraim Zuroff of the Simon Wiesenthal Center, as support for them. In a press release, Grabar-Kitarović rejected what she described as "malicious interpretations" of her statement.

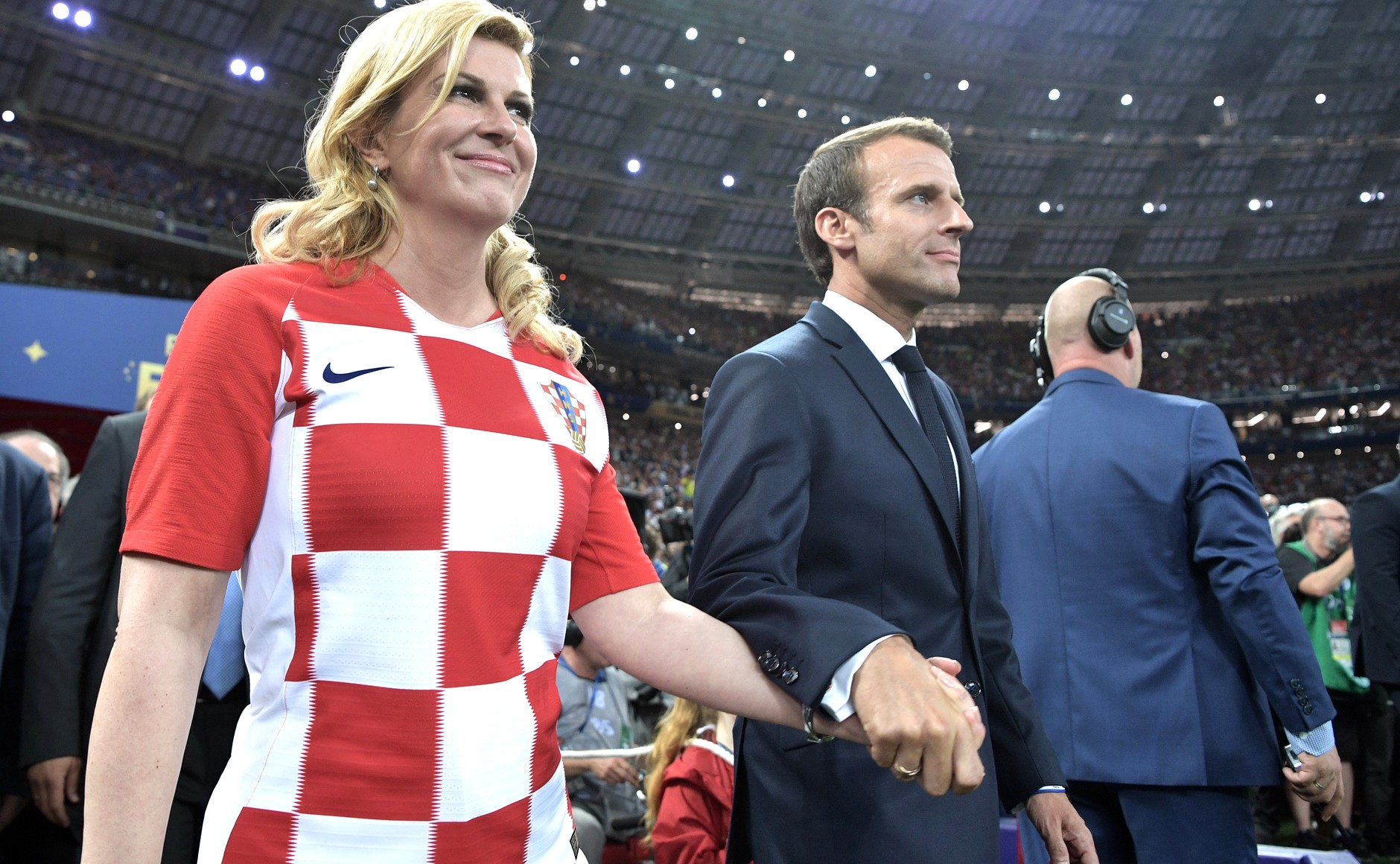
Grabar-Kitarović and French President Emmanuel Macron after the 2018 World Cup final between the two countries

During the 2018 FIFA World Cup, held in Russia, Grabar-Kitarović attended the quarter-final and final matches, wearing the colors of the national flag in support of the national team, which ultimately ended up as tournament runners-up. According to the analytics company Mediatoolkit, she "emerged as her country’s star of the tournament" with "25% more focus on her in news stories about the final than any of the players on the pitch", as she "travelled to Russia at her own expense in economy class and often watched from the non-VIP stands". Commenting on the appearance of Croatian singer Marko Perković at the celebration, Grabar-Kitarović stated that she “never heard” such songs nor “seen any evidence that they exist”, was "very fond" of some of his songs and that she did not see any evidence for the controversies associated to him, claiming his songs are "good for national unity". She condemned all totalitarian regimes, including nazism, fascism, and communism.

Grabar-Kitarović was awarded Fulbright Association's 2019 Lifetime Achievement Award for her "remarkable, contributions as a leader, diplomat, and public servant".

=== 2019–20 Croatian presidential election ===
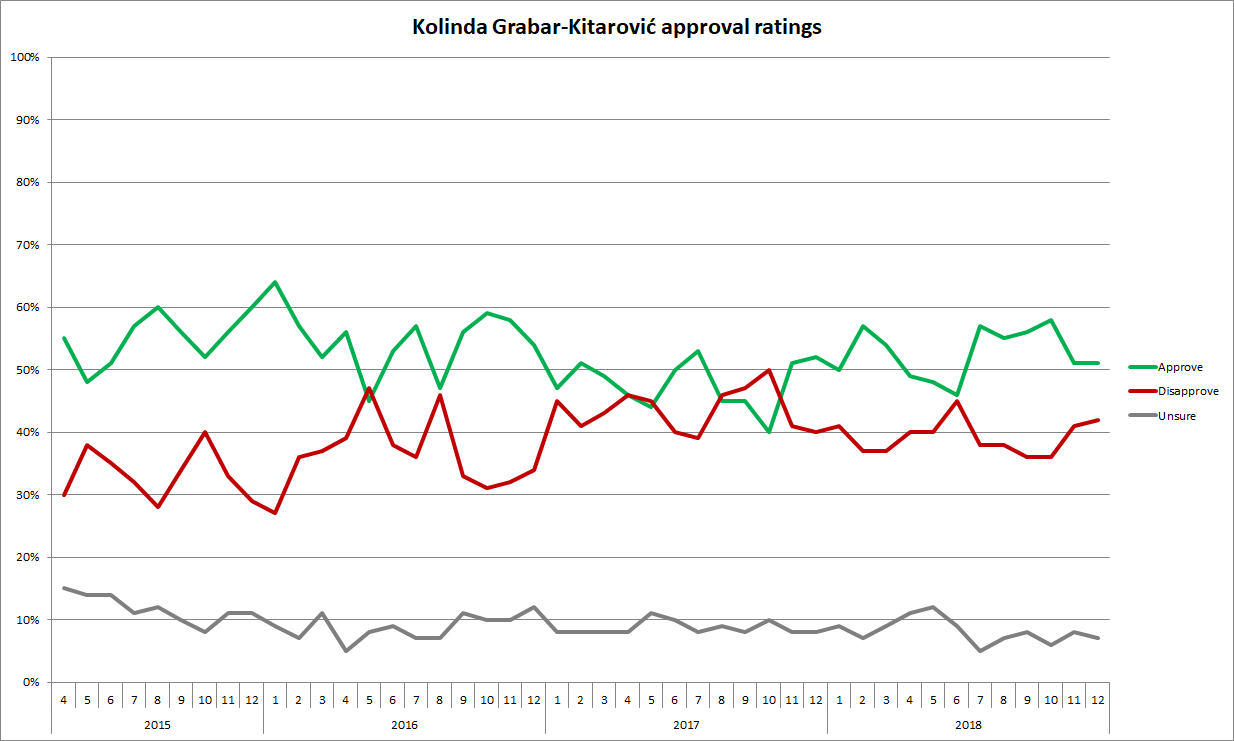
Grabar-Kitarović's approval ratings

In August 2019, during the Victory Day celebrations in Knin, Grabar-Kitarović informally hinted that she would be seeking reelection to a second and final 5-year term as president in the upcoming election, and formally confirmed this several days later in an interview for the right-wing publication Hrvatski tjednik (Croatian Weekly). Prime Minister and HDZ President Andrej Plenković announced that the HDZ would support her bid for a second term. On 2 October 2019, Grabar-Kitarović formally announced her bid for re-election with the campaign slogan "Because I believe in Croatia". She thus proceeded to face 10 other candidates in the first round on 22 December 2019, with her main challengers being former Social Democratic Prime Minister Zoran Milanović and conservative folk musician and former Member of Parliament Miroslav Škoro. Zoran Milanović won a plurality of 29.55% of the vote, ahead of Grabar-Kitarović, who received 26.65% of the vote, while Miroslav Škoro attracted the support of 24.45% of voters. Therefore, this election marked the first time in Croatian history that the incumbent president did not receive the highest number of votes in the first round. Grabar-Kitarović only managed to defeat Škoro by a margin of 2.2% of the vote, and therefore narrowly proceeded to the run-off against Milanović. Also, Grabar-Kitarović attained both the lowest number of votes (507,626) and the lowest percentage of votes of any sitting Croatian president competing in either of the two rounds of elections. Furthermore, Milanović attained both the lowest number of votes (562,779) and the lowest percentage of the vote of any winning candidate in the first round of a presidential election.

A run-off election took place between Milanović and Grabar-Kitarović on 5 January 2020. She was eventually defeated in her bid for reelection by Milanović, who won 52.66% of the vote, while Grabar-Kitarović, who had tried to unite a fractured right–wing, garnered 47.3%. The turnout was about 55%. She is thus the second President of Croatia to not win a second term, after her predecessor Ivo Josipović. Grabar-Kitarović left the presidency on 18 February 2020, when she handed over the office to Milanović, who thus became the 5th President of Croatia since its independence.

== Political positions ==
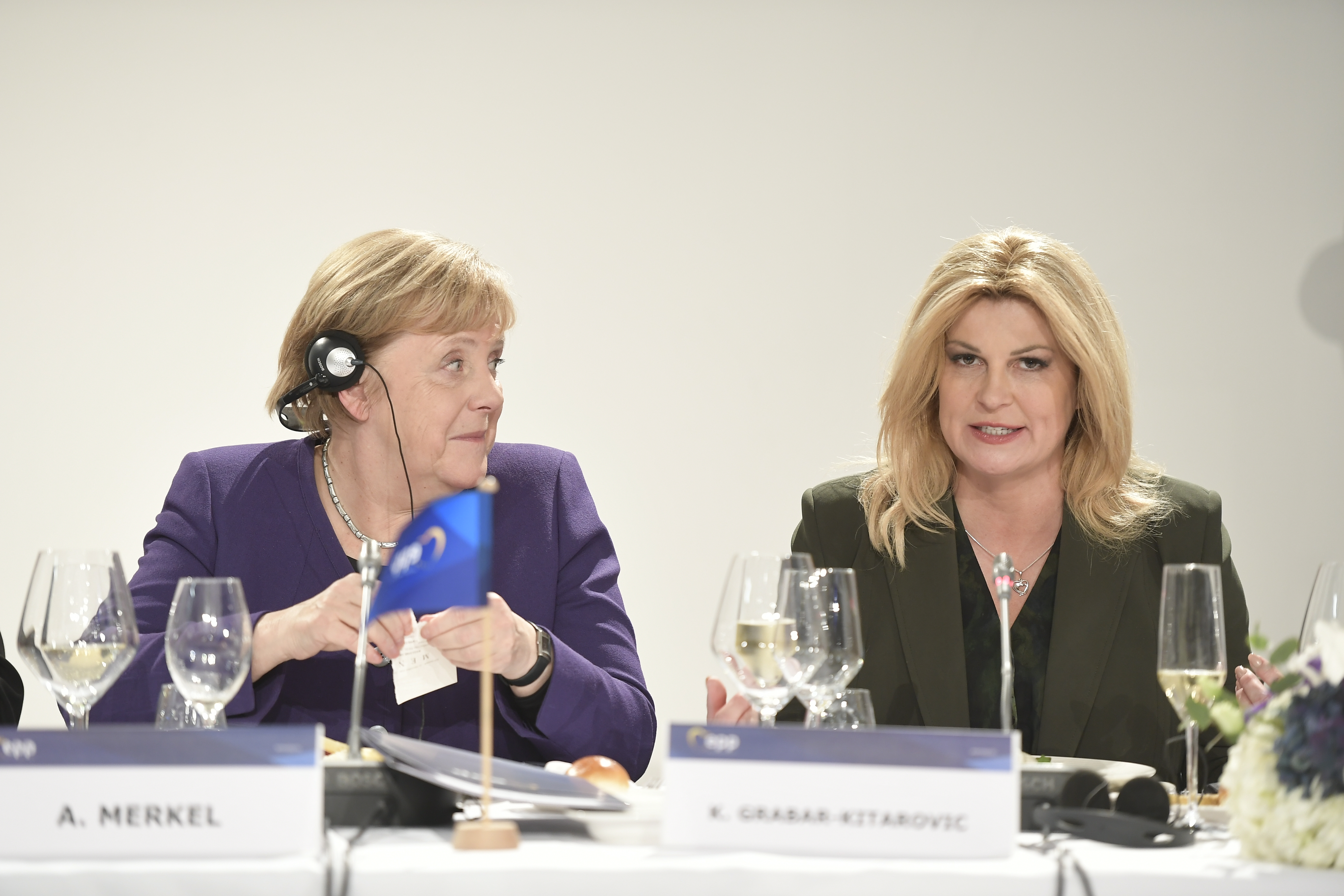
Grabar-Kitarović with German Chancellor Angela Merkel at an EPP Summit in Zagreb, 20 November 2019

Grabar-Kitarović declared herself a "modern conservative" during the 2014–15 presidential election. Her political positions have mostly been described as conservative in the media. Agence France-Presse wrote that Grabar-Kitarović represents moderates within her party. Some observers describe her actions as populist, or nationalist.

On the societal level, she moderates the positions of her party, traditionally reticent towards LGBT rights and abortion. On the issue of same-sex marriage, Grabar-Kitarović expressed her support for the Life Partnership Act, which enabled same-sex couples to enjoy rights equal to heterosexual married couples except in adoption, as good compromise.

Grabar-Kitarović considers that the prohibition of abortion would not solve anything, and stresses that attention should be paid to education in order to prevent unwanted pregnancies. Grabar-Kitarović criticized the hard process of adoption and stated that "the whole system has to be reformed so that through education and social measures it enables every woman to give birth to a child, and that mother and the child can eventually be taken care of in an appropriate manner."

Grabar-Kitarović has spoken in support of green initiatives along with the dangers of climate change for the environment and global security. In 2016, she signed the Paris Agreement at UN Headquarters in New York City. During another speech at the UN, she stated that climate change was a "powerful weapon of mass destruction."

== International Olympic Committee ==
In 2020, she was elected to the International Olympic Committee as the 4th representative of Croatia in this body and first female member in this position.

== Personal life ==
Grabar-Kitarović has been married to Jakov Kitarović since 1996 and they have two children. Grabar-Kitarović is a practising Roman Catholic. In an interview for Croatian Catholic Network, she stated that she regularly attends Mass and prays the Rosary. In an interview for Narodni radio, Grabar-Kitarović stated that her favorite singer was Croatian nationalist singer Marko Perković. She speaks Croatian, English, Spanish and Portuguese fluently and has basic understanding of German, French and Italian.

On 30 December 2020, Grabar-Kitarović made a cameo appearance in the Croatian telenovela Dar mar, playing herself.

== Honours ==
Award or decoration	Country	Date
Knight of the Order of the White Eagle	Poland	24 May 2022
Recipient of the National Flag Decoration	Albania	29 October 2019
Grand Collar of the Order of Prince Henry	Portugal	27 April 2018
Grand Cross with Chain of the Order of the Star of Romania	Romania	2 October 2017
Collar of the Order of Mubarak the Great	Kuwait	5 February 2017
Sash of the Order of Stara Planina	Bulgaria	25 August 2016

== See also ==
- Three Seas Initiative
- List of elected and appointed female heads of state

== Notes ==
Political offices
Preceded by Neven Mimica	Minister of European Integration; 2003–2005	Position abolished
Preceded by Miomir Žužul as Minister of Foreign Affairs	Minister of Foreign Affairs and European Integration; 2005–2008	Succeeded by Gordan Jandroković
Preceded by Herself as Minister of European Integration	Minister of Foreign Affairs and European Integration; 2005–2008	Succeeded by Gordan Jandroković
Preceded by Ivo Josipović	President of Croatia; 2015–2020	Succeeded by Zoran Milanović
Diplomatic posts
Preceded by Neven Jurica	Ambassador of Croatia to the United States; 2008–2011	Succeeded by Vice Skračić; Acting
Preceded by Stefanie Babst; Acting	Assistant Secretary General of NATO for Public Diplomacy; 2011–2014	Succeeded by Ted Whiteside; Acting
Preceded by Dalia Grybauskaitė	Chair of the Council of Women World Leaders; 2019–2020	Succeeded by Katrín Jakobsdóttir
