= Neven Jurica =

Croatian diplomat and politician

H.E. Neven Jurica

Permanent Representative to the United Nations for the Republic of Croatia
- In office February 2008 – September 2009
- Preceded by: Mirjana Mladineo
- Succeeded by: Ranko Vilović

Personal details
- Born: 4 April 1952 (age 74)

Neven Jurica (born 4 April 1952) is a Croatian politician who worked in Croatian diplomacy between 1992 and 2009. Between February 2008 and September 2009 he was the Permanent Representative of Croatia to the United Nations.

== Biography ==
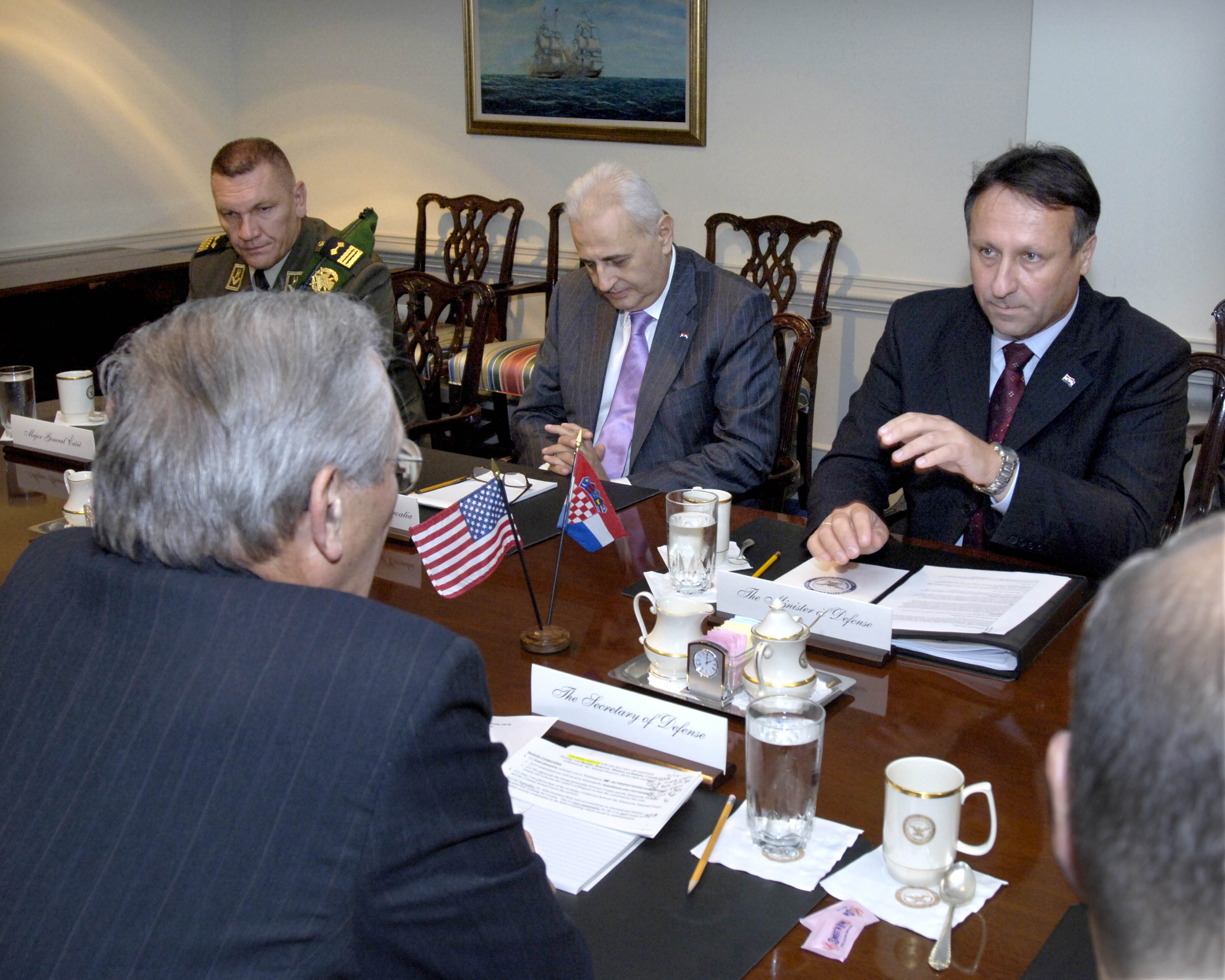
Neven Jurica (center), Croatian Minister of Defense Berislav Rončević (right) and Maj. Gen. Gordan Čačić (left) in a meeting with Donald Rumsfeld

Jurica has a degree in comparative literature and philosophy, and a Master of Arts in literary theory from the University of Zagreb. From 1980 to 1989, he worked as a writer and published in excess of 16 books on literary theory and criticism. At the same time, he oversaw a literary forum, "Literary Friday".

In 1990 he was a founding member of the Croatian Democratic Union and served as Political Secretary. Following the first democratic elections in Croatia in 1990, he was elected to the Parliament and served as Chairman of the Human Rights Committee (1990–1992).

Jurica has served as the Croatian Ambassador to Australia and New Zealand between 1992 and December 1995. He was the Ambassador in Bulgaria (1996–1997) and Norway (1998–2000). He was the Croatian Ambassador to the United States of America between 2004 and 2008.

Between 2003 and 2004 he was the Chairman of the Foreign Affairs Committee of the Croatian Parliament.

As the Permanent Representative to the UN, he represented Croatia in the United Nations Security Council and served as the President of the council in December 2008.

After being replaced as the Representative to the UN, the Croatian anti-corruption agency USKOK brought charges against Jurica for embezzlement of US$120,000. Jurica has described his finance as "chaotic" and reimbursed the Ministry of Foreign Affairs for the amount in question, but maintained that the money was not used for personal gain. On 22 April 2010, after a trial at the County Court in Zagreb, Jurica was sentenced to 18 months of prison.

Jurica holds membership in the Croatian Writers' Association and P.E.N. (Poets, Essayists, and Novelists).

He is married with two children.

== See also ==
- List of current permanent representatives to the United Nations
- Croatian War of Independence

Diplomatic posts
Preceded by ?	Ambassador of Croatia to Australia; 1992–1995	Succeeded by Jozo Meter
Preceded by Darinko Bago	Ambassador of Croatia to Bulgaria; 1996–1997	Succeeded by Mate Meštrović
Preceded by ?	Ambassador of Croatia to Norway; 1998–2000	Succeeded by ?
Preceded by ?	Ambassador of Croatia to the United States; 2005–2008	Succeeded by Kolinda Grabar-Kitarović
Preceded by Mirjana Mladineo	Permanent Representative of Croatia to the United Nations; 2008–2009	Succeeded by Ranko Vilović
