= Pjer Šimunović =

Croatian Ambassador to the United States

His Excellency Pjer Šimunović
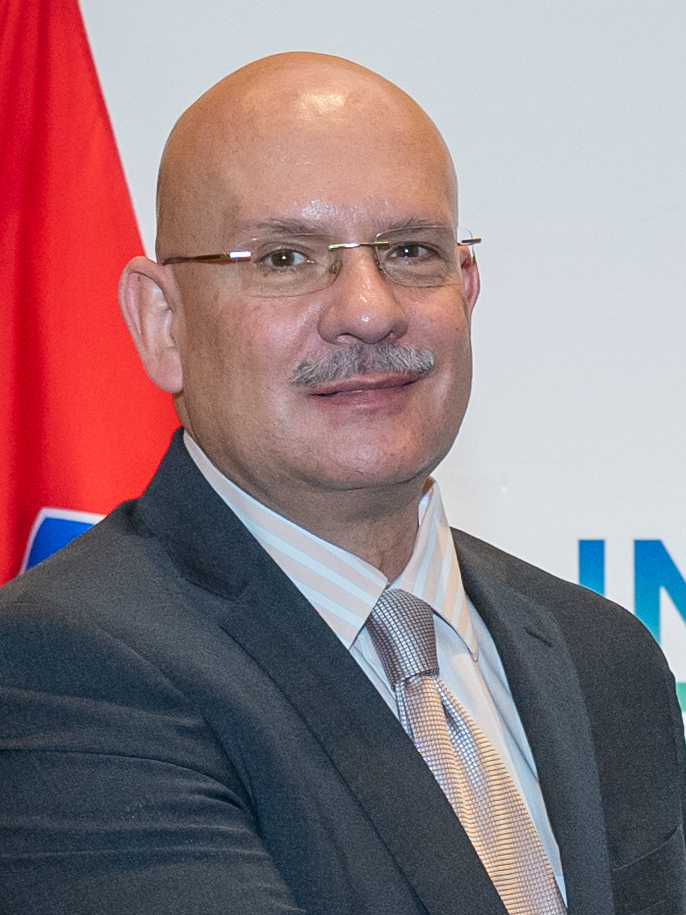

Croatian Ambassador to the United States
- Incumbent
- Assumed office September 8, 2017
- President: Kolinda Grabar-Kitarović; Zoran Milanović
- Preceded by: Josip Paro

Croatian Ambassador to Israel
- In office August 2012 – April 2016
- President: Kolinda Grabar-Kitarović; Ivo Josipović
- Preceded by: Marica Matković
- Succeeded by: Vesela Mrđen Korać

Personal details
- Born: 8 September 1962 (age 64) Split, PR Croatia, FPR Yugoslavia
- Spouse: Ružica Šimunović
- Education: University of Zagreb (B.A.); King's College London (M.A.)

Pjer Šimunović (born 8 January 1962) is Croatian diplomat and former journalist who has served as the Croatian Ambassador to the United States since 2017. He presented his credentials to President Donald Trump at the White House on September 8, 2017. He succeeded Josip Paro, who served as Croatia's ambassador in Washington from April 2012 to May 2016.

== Education ==
Born in Split, Croatia, while it was a part of Yugoslavia, Šimunović earned a B.A. in Philosophy, Comparative Literature, and Italian Language and Literature at the University of Zagreb in 1988.

Šimunović started his career as a journalist at Večernji List, a conservative daily newspaper in Zagreb, from August 1988 to October 1990. He covered the unraveling of the Soviet empire in Eastern Europe, including free elections in Poland, the Romanian Revolution, the fall of the Berlin Wall, and other events. He was then a fellow for European affairs at the Fondation Journalistes en Europe (Foundation for Journalists in Europe) in Paris, France, from October 1990 to June 1991.

Šimunović left Croatia in October 1993 to work at BBC World Service Radio's Croatian Section as a journalist and producer, remaining until September 1998. At the same time, he earned a master's degree in War Studies at King's College London in December 1997.

== Career ==
Šimunović joined the Croatian Ministry of Foreign Affairs in Zagreb in September 1998 as deputy head of the Analytical Department, staying until March 2000. He later explained that nearly all his journalist friends who had covered international affairs were asked to join the Ministry, “because we didn’t have one before,” and journalists covering foreign affairs were the best available experts not tainted by ties to the old regime.

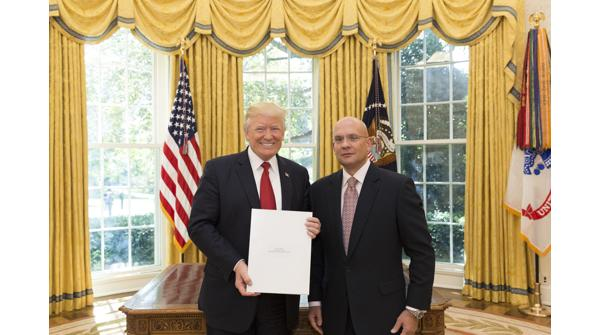
Ambassador Šimunović presents his credentials to President Donald Trump at the White House in September 2017.

He served his first foreign posting at the Croatian embassy in Paris, where he served as first secretary and counsellor for political affairs, as well as deputy head of mission, from March 2000 to September 2003.

Šimunović left the Foreign Ministry to return to journalism and to the Večernji List, working as an advisor to the board from September 2003 to February 2004. But when the Foreign Ministry asked him to return to serve as chief negotiator with NATO, Šimunović agreed. He served as national coordinator for NATO, as well as assistant minister for International Organizations and Security, from March 2004 to July 2008. Croatia entered NATO's Partnership for Peace in 2000 and became the 28th and most recent member of the European Union on July 1, 2013.

Šimunović then left the Foreign Ministry for the Ministry of Defense, serving as Director of Defense Policy from August 2008 to February 2009, and as State Secretary for Defense Policy from February 2009 to December 2011. He was appointed Croatian Ambassador to the United States on September 8, 2017.

== Personal life ==
Pjer Šimunović was married to Ružica Šimunović, a journalist and visual arts correspondent for Croatian National Radio, with whom he had an adult daughter. His wife died in Washington, D.C., on April 27, 2018.

In a 2013 interview with Israeli political activist Michael Freund of The Jerusalem Post, Šimunović revealed that he is the first cousin, twice removed, of Jakša Kalogjera (of the aristocratic Kalogjera family of Blato, Korčula), declared Righteous Among the Nations by Yad Vashem in 2001.
