= Miomir Žužul =

Croatian diplomat and politician

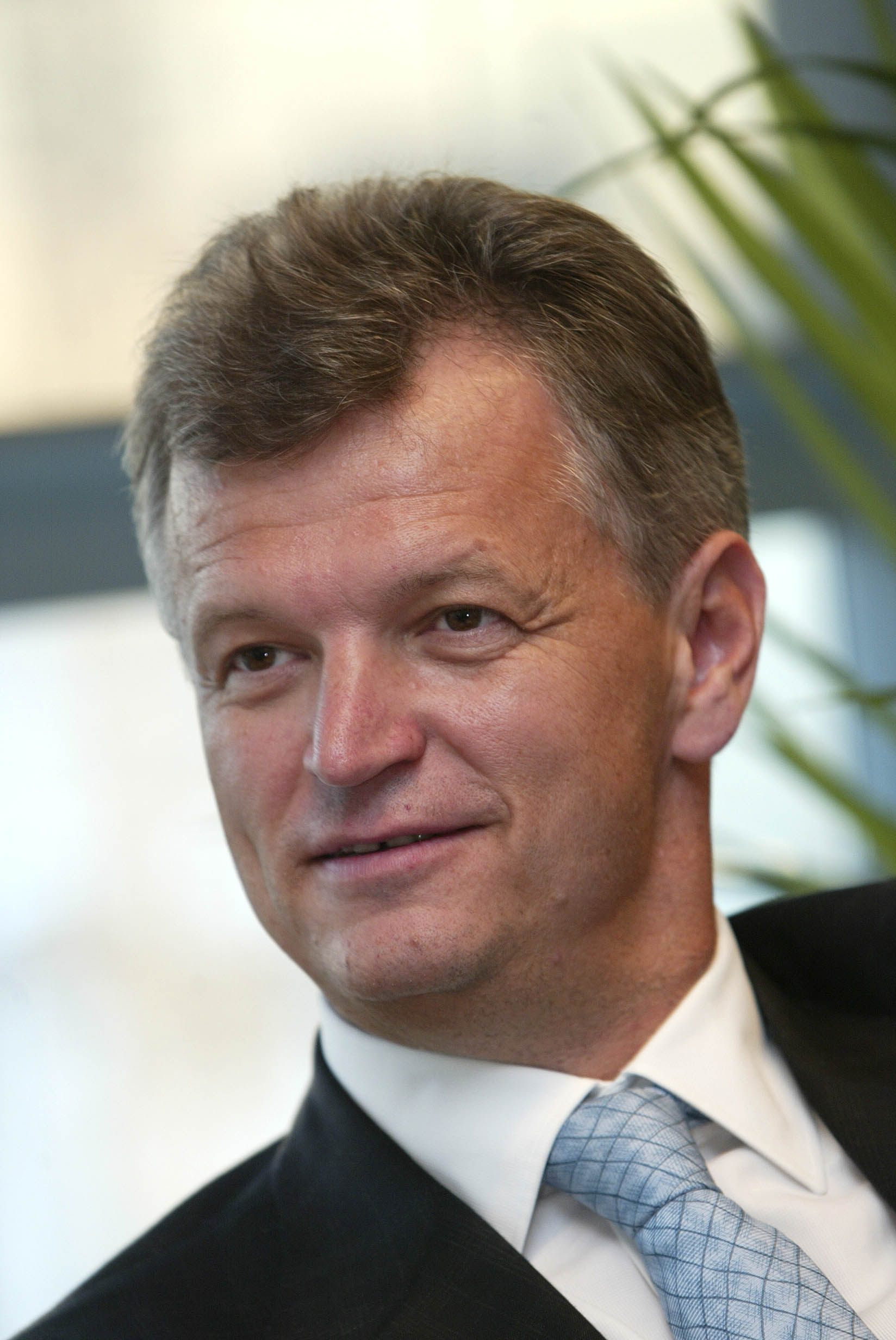
- Miomir Žužul in 2004

Minister of Foreign Affairs
- In office 23 December 2003 – 17 February 2005
- Prime Minister: Ivo Sanader
- Preceded by: Tonino Picula
- Succeeded by: Kolinda Grabar-Kitarović

Personal details
- Born: 19 June 1955 (age 71) Split, PR Croatia, FPR Yugoslavia (modern Croatia)
- Party: Croatian Democratic Union
- Education: University of Zagreb; Harvard Kennedy School

Miomir Žužul (born 19 June 1955) is a Croatian diplomat and politician. He is currently a senior international policy advisor at the firm of Arnold & Porter Kaye Scholer LLP in Washington, DC.

== Education ==
Žužul obtained a doctorate in psychology at the University of Zagreb in 1987 as well as a doctorate in conflict management at the John F. Kennedy School of Government at Harvard University. In 1990 he became a full professor at the Faculty of Humanities and Social Sciences in Zagreb.

== Politics ==
Žužul started his political career as a member of Communist party of the Socialist Republic of Croatia. He left the party in 1987 and, with the fall of communism, entered the new dominant right wing party of Croatian Democratic Union (HDZ). Žužul was previously the foreign minister of Croatia (2003–2005), Croatian Ambassador to the United States (1996–2000), Croatian deputy foreign minister (1992–1993) and Croatian ambassador to the United Nations (1993–1996). Žužul was involved in Washington Agreement (1994) and Dayton Agreement (1995) as a member of the Croatian negotiating team.

During his early diplomatic career, Žužul befriended many important people in American political and business circles. He has often been perceived as one of the more pro-American politicians in Croatia. In early 2000s, he was one of the most trusted allies of Ivo Sanader in his struggle for the leadership of the HDZ.

He was named the new foreign minister in the Ivo Sanader government in December 2003. In 2004 various Croatian media began to publish details of alleged corruption scandals involving Žužul. Although Žužul denied those charges, even some of Sanader's allies in Sabor expressed desire to have him removed. Sanader resisted this pressure and had Žužul keep his post. The Croatian Parliament cleared Žužul of the charges brought against him, and the majority of the media outlets that initially reported corruption allegations against Žužul have retracted their stories. Court cases against the rest are pending.

However, in January 2005, Žužul announced his resignation because he did not want to pose a burden for the government, and formally left his post in February. Sanader's candidate Jadranka Kosor during presidential elections commented that she expected the resignation to come.

On 17 August 2007, Organization for Security and Co-operation in Europe Chairman-in-Office, Spanish Foreign Minister Miguel Angel Moratinos, appointed Žužul, "to be his personal representative in a mission to Georgia on (a) missile incident that took place on 6 August," alleged to be a Russian missile strike on Georgian territory.
