= Embassy of Croatia, Washington, D.C. =

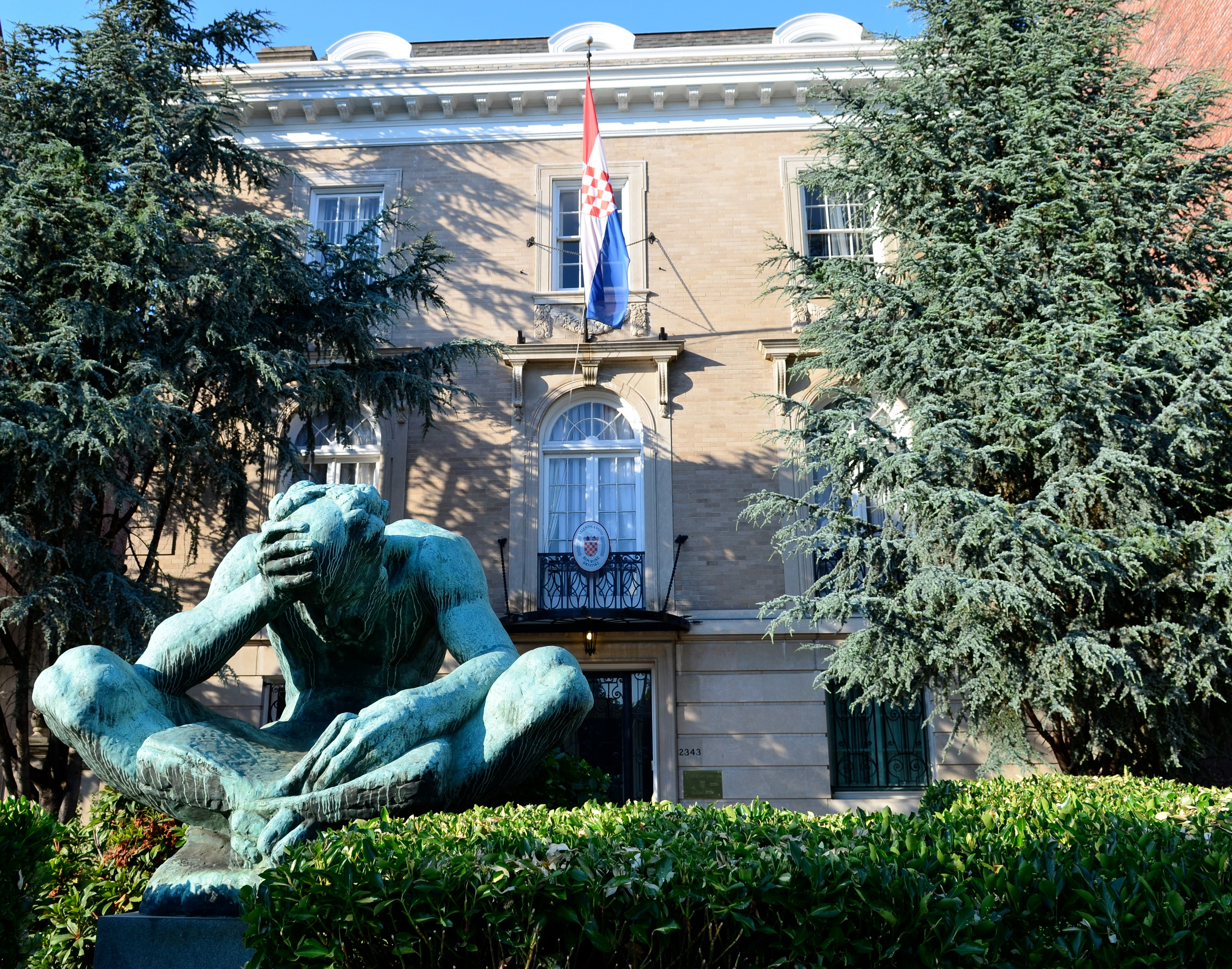
- The Embassy of Croatia in Washington, D.C.
- Location: Washington, D.C.
- Address: 2343 Massachusetts Avenue, N.W.
- Coordinates: 38°54′49″N 77°3′7.6″W
- Ambassador: Pjer Šimunović

The Croatian Embassy in Washington, D.C., is the primary Croatian diplomatic mission to the United States overseeing Croatia–United States bilateral relations. The embassy represents the interests of Croatia and Croatian citizens in the United States and conducts the majority of diplomatic work on such interests within the U.S. It is the primary residence of the Croatian Ambassador to the United States. Pjer Šimunović has been the Croatian Ambassador since 2017.

It is located on Embassy Row at 2343 Massachusetts Avenue, Northwest Washington, D.C. in the Embassy Row neighborhood near Dupont Circle. The embassy also operates Consulates-General in Anchorage, Chicago, Houston, Kansas City, Los Angeles, New Orleans, New York City, Pittsburgh, and Seattle.

== Building ==
The building was the Embassy of Austria, which vacated it for larger quarters, and sold the structure to Croatia in 1993. About half of the $2.5 million purchase price of the building was raised from within the Croatian-American community; another $700,000 was raised for renovations by the Croatian-American community of Cleveland. Some 400 volunteers donated time, materials and skills to aid in the renovation, too. In front of the embassy is a large sculpture of St. Jerome by Croatian sculptor Ivan Meštrović.

== See also ==
- Croatian diplomatic missions
- List of diplomatic missions of Croatia
- List of ambassadors of the United States to Croatia
